

291001–291100 

|-bgcolor=#d6d6d6
| 291001 ||  || — || December 2, 2005 || Kitt Peak || Spacewatch || — || align=right | 2.9 km || 
|-id=002 bgcolor=#d6d6d6
| 291002 ||  || — || December 5, 2005 || Kitt Peak || Spacewatch || — || align=right | 2.6 km || 
|-id=003 bgcolor=#d6d6d6
| 291003 ||  || — || December 8, 2005 || Kitt Peak || Spacewatch || — || align=right | 3.4 km || 
|-id=004 bgcolor=#fefefe
| 291004 ||  || — || December 10, 2005 || Kitt Peak || Spacewatch || — || align=right data-sort-value="0.71" | 710 m || 
|-id=005 bgcolor=#FA8072
| 291005 ||  || — || December 10, 2005 || Catalina || CSS || — || align=right | 1.3 km || 
|-id=006 bgcolor=#fefefe
| 291006 ||  || — || December 1, 2005 || Kitt Peak || M. W. Buie || — || align=right data-sort-value="0.74" | 740 m || 
|-id=007 bgcolor=#fefefe
| 291007 ||  || — || December 2, 2005 || Kitt Peak || M. W. Buie || — || align=right data-sort-value="0.82" | 820 m || 
|-id=008 bgcolor=#E9E9E9
| 291008 ||  || — || December 2, 2005 || Kitt Peak || M. W. Buie || HEN || align=right | 1.0 km || 
|-id=009 bgcolor=#d6d6d6
| 291009 ||  || — || December 2, 2005 || Kitt Peak || Spacewatch || KOR || align=right | 1.5 km || 
|-id=010 bgcolor=#E9E9E9
| 291010 ||  || — || December 7, 2005 || Kitt Peak || Spacewatch || — || align=right | 1.1 km || 
|-id=011 bgcolor=#E9E9E9
| 291011 ||  || — || December 21, 2005 || Catalina || CSS || — || align=right | 1.8 km || 
|-id=012 bgcolor=#fefefe
| 291012 ||  || — || December 22, 2005 || Pla D'Arguines || R. Ferrando || — || align=right | 1.4 km || 
|-id=013 bgcolor=#d6d6d6
| 291013 ||  || — || December 21, 2005 || Junk Bond || D. Healy || THM || align=right | 2.6 km || 
|-id=014 bgcolor=#E9E9E9
| 291014 ||  || — || December 22, 2005 || Kitt Peak || Spacewatch || EUN || align=right | 2.0 km || 
|-id=015 bgcolor=#E9E9E9
| 291015 ||  || — || December 21, 2005 || Kitt Peak || Spacewatch || — || align=right | 2.3 km || 
|-id=016 bgcolor=#E9E9E9
| 291016 ||  || — || December 21, 2005 || Kitt Peak || Spacewatch || — || align=right | 1.7 km || 
|-id=017 bgcolor=#fefefe
| 291017 ||  || — || December 21, 2005 || Kitt Peak || Spacewatch || — || align=right data-sort-value="0.82" | 820 m || 
|-id=018 bgcolor=#fefefe
| 291018 ||  || — || December 22, 2005 || Kitt Peak || Spacewatch || — || align=right data-sort-value="0.82" | 820 m || 
|-id=019 bgcolor=#d6d6d6
| 291019 ||  || — || December 22, 2005 || Kitt Peak || Spacewatch || — || align=right | 3.3 km || 
|-id=020 bgcolor=#E9E9E9
| 291020 ||  || — || December 23, 2005 || Kitt Peak || Spacewatch || — || align=right | 2.6 km || 
|-id=021 bgcolor=#fefefe
| 291021 ||  || — || December 24, 2005 || Kitt Peak || Spacewatch || V || align=right data-sort-value="0.96" | 960 m || 
|-id=022 bgcolor=#fefefe
| 291022 ||  || — || December 24, 2005 || Kitt Peak || Spacewatch || — || align=right | 1.1 km || 
|-id=023 bgcolor=#d6d6d6
| 291023 ||  || — || December 24, 2005 || Kitt Peak || Spacewatch || — || align=right | 3.5 km || 
|-id=024 bgcolor=#d6d6d6
| 291024 ||  || — || December 22, 2005 || Kitt Peak || Spacewatch || — || align=right | 2.6 km || 
|-id=025 bgcolor=#d6d6d6
| 291025 ||  || — || December 22, 2005 || Kitt Peak || Spacewatch || — || align=right | 3.1 km || 
|-id=026 bgcolor=#d6d6d6
| 291026 ||  || — || December 22, 2005 || Kitt Peak || Spacewatch || THM || align=right | 2.2 km || 
|-id=027 bgcolor=#fefefe
| 291027 ||  || — || December 24, 2005 || Kitt Peak || Spacewatch || NYS || align=right data-sort-value="0.66" | 660 m || 
|-id=028 bgcolor=#d6d6d6
| 291028 ||  || — || December 21, 2005 || Kitt Peak || Spacewatch || — || align=right | 3.1 km || 
|-id=029 bgcolor=#fefefe
| 291029 ||  || — || December 22, 2005 || Kitt Peak || Spacewatch || — || align=right data-sort-value="0.82" | 820 m || 
|-id=030 bgcolor=#fefefe
| 291030 ||  || — || December 22, 2005 || Kitt Peak || Spacewatch || FLO || align=right data-sort-value="0.66" | 660 m || 
|-id=031 bgcolor=#fefefe
| 291031 ||  || — || December 24, 2005 || Kitt Peak || Spacewatch || — || align=right | 1.2 km || 
|-id=032 bgcolor=#fefefe
| 291032 ||  || — || December 24, 2005 || Kitt Peak || Spacewatch || — || align=right | 1.8 km || 
|-id=033 bgcolor=#fefefe
| 291033 ||  || — || December 25, 2005 || Kitt Peak || Spacewatch || — || align=right data-sort-value="0.78" | 780 m || 
|-id=034 bgcolor=#E9E9E9
| 291034 ||  || — || December 25, 2005 || Kitt Peak || Spacewatch || — || align=right | 2.4 km || 
|-id=035 bgcolor=#fefefe
| 291035 ||  || — || December 24, 2005 || Socorro || LINEAR || H || align=right data-sort-value="0.87" | 870 m || 
|-id=036 bgcolor=#d6d6d6
| 291036 ||  || — || December 26, 2005 || Catalina || CSS || — || align=right | 3.7 km || 
|-id=037 bgcolor=#fefefe
| 291037 ||  || — || December 22, 2005 || Kitt Peak || Spacewatch || — || align=right data-sort-value="0.76" | 760 m || 
|-id=038 bgcolor=#fefefe
| 291038 ||  || — || December 24, 2005 || Kitt Peak || Spacewatch || — || align=right data-sort-value="0.82" | 820 m || 
|-id=039 bgcolor=#d6d6d6
| 291039 ||  || — || December 25, 2005 || Mount Lemmon || Mount Lemmon Survey || — || align=right | 3.5 km || 
|-id=040 bgcolor=#fefefe
| 291040 ||  || — || December 22, 2005 || Kitt Peak || Spacewatch || — || align=right data-sort-value="0.74" | 740 m || 
|-id=041 bgcolor=#fefefe
| 291041 ||  || — || December 25, 2005 || Kitt Peak || Spacewatch || — || align=right data-sort-value="0.76" | 760 m || 
|-id=042 bgcolor=#d6d6d6
| 291042 ||  || — || December 25, 2005 || Kitt Peak || Spacewatch || EOS || align=right | 2.3 km || 
|-id=043 bgcolor=#fefefe
| 291043 ||  || — || December 21, 2005 || Kitt Peak || Spacewatch || — || align=right data-sort-value="0.95" | 950 m || 
|-id=044 bgcolor=#fefefe
| 291044 ||  || — || December 22, 2005 || Kitt Peak || Spacewatch || MAS || align=right data-sort-value="0.82" | 820 m || 
|-id=045 bgcolor=#d6d6d6
| 291045 ||  || — || December 24, 2005 || Kitt Peak || Spacewatch || HYG || align=right | 3.4 km || 
|-id=046 bgcolor=#E9E9E9
| 291046 ||  || — || December 25, 2005 || Kitt Peak || Spacewatch || — || align=right | 2.1 km || 
|-id=047 bgcolor=#E9E9E9
| 291047 ||  || — || December 25, 2005 || Mount Lemmon || Mount Lemmon Survey || — || align=right | 2.1 km || 
|-id=048 bgcolor=#fefefe
| 291048 ||  || — || December 22, 2005 || Kitt Peak || Spacewatch || NYS || align=right data-sort-value="0.63" | 630 m || 
|-id=049 bgcolor=#E9E9E9
| 291049 ||  || — || December 24, 2005 || Kitt Peak || Spacewatch || — || align=right | 2.5 km || 
|-id=050 bgcolor=#fefefe
| 291050 ||  || — || December 25, 2005 || Kitt Peak || Spacewatch || — || align=right | 1.1 km || 
|-id=051 bgcolor=#E9E9E9
| 291051 ||  || — || December 25, 2005 || Kitt Peak || Spacewatch || — || align=right | 2.0 km || 
|-id=052 bgcolor=#d6d6d6
| 291052 ||  || — || December 24, 2005 || Kitt Peak || Spacewatch || THM || align=right | 2.6 km || 
|-id=053 bgcolor=#d6d6d6
| 291053 ||  || — || December 24, 2005 || Kitt Peak || Spacewatch || THM || align=right | 2.7 km || 
|-id=054 bgcolor=#d6d6d6
| 291054 ||  || — || December 24, 2005 || Kitt Peak || Spacewatch || — || align=right | 4.4 km || 
|-id=055 bgcolor=#fefefe
| 291055 ||  || — || December 24, 2005 || Kitt Peak || Spacewatch || MAS || align=right data-sort-value="0.75" | 750 m || 
|-id=056 bgcolor=#fefefe
| 291056 ||  || — || December 25, 2005 || Kitt Peak || Spacewatch || — || align=right | 2.1 km || 
|-id=057 bgcolor=#fefefe
| 291057 ||  || — || December 25, 2005 || Kitt Peak || Spacewatch || MAS || align=right data-sort-value="0.95" | 950 m || 
|-id=058 bgcolor=#fefefe
| 291058 ||  || — || December 26, 2005 || Kitt Peak || Spacewatch || NYS || align=right data-sort-value="0.72" | 720 m || 
|-id=059 bgcolor=#d6d6d6
| 291059 ||  || — || December 27, 2005 || Mount Lemmon || Mount Lemmon Survey || KOR || align=right | 1.9 km || 
|-id=060 bgcolor=#fefefe
| 291060 ||  || — || December 24, 2005 || Kitt Peak || Spacewatch || — || align=right data-sort-value="0.98" | 980 m || 
|-id=061 bgcolor=#d6d6d6
| 291061 ||  || — || December 24, 2005 || Kitt Peak || Spacewatch || THM || align=right | 2.7 km || 
|-id=062 bgcolor=#E9E9E9
| 291062 ||  || — || December 24, 2005 || Kitt Peak || Spacewatch || HOF || align=right | 3.0 km || 
|-id=063 bgcolor=#d6d6d6
| 291063 ||  || — || December 25, 2005 || Mount Lemmon || Mount Lemmon Survey || — || align=right | 3.9 km || 
|-id=064 bgcolor=#d6d6d6
| 291064 ||  || — || December 25, 2005 || Mount Lemmon || Mount Lemmon Survey || 7:4 || align=right | 3.1 km || 
|-id=065 bgcolor=#d6d6d6
| 291065 ||  || — || December 26, 2005 || Mount Lemmon || Mount Lemmon Survey || EUP || align=right | 5.4 km || 
|-id=066 bgcolor=#d6d6d6
| 291066 ||  || — || December 26, 2005 || Mount Lemmon || Mount Lemmon Survey || CHA || align=right | 2.8 km || 
|-id=067 bgcolor=#E9E9E9
| 291067 ||  || — || December 27, 2005 || Mount Lemmon || Mount Lemmon Survey || — || align=right | 2.7 km || 
|-id=068 bgcolor=#fefefe
| 291068 ||  || — || December 26, 2005 || Kitt Peak || Spacewatch || FLO || align=right data-sort-value="0.78" | 780 m || 
|-id=069 bgcolor=#fefefe
| 291069 ||  || — || December 25, 2005 || Kitt Peak || Spacewatch || MAS || align=right | 1.0 km || 
|-id=070 bgcolor=#E9E9E9
| 291070 ||  || — || December 25, 2005 || Kitt Peak || Spacewatch || — || align=right | 1.2 km || 
|-id=071 bgcolor=#d6d6d6
| 291071 ||  || — || December 25, 2005 || Kitt Peak || Spacewatch || — || align=right | 3.0 km || 
|-id=072 bgcolor=#d6d6d6
| 291072 ||  || — || December 25, 2005 || Kitt Peak || Spacewatch || — || align=right | 3.5 km || 
|-id=073 bgcolor=#d6d6d6
| 291073 ||  || — || December 25, 2005 || Kitt Peak || Spacewatch || — || align=right | 4.4 km || 
|-id=074 bgcolor=#fefefe
| 291074 ||  || — || December 25, 2005 || Kitt Peak || Spacewatch || FLO || align=right data-sort-value="0.79" | 790 m || 
|-id=075 bgcolor=#fefefe
| 291075 ||  || — || December 25, 2005 || Kitt Peak || Spacewatch || — || align=right data-sort-value="0.84" | 840 m || 
|-id=076 bgcolor=#E9E9E9
| 291076 ||  || — || December 25, 2005 || Kitt Peak || Spacewatch || — || align=right | 1.7 km || 
|-id=077 bgcolor=#E9E9E9
| 291077 ||  || — || December 27, 2005 || Mount Lemmon || Mount Lemmon Survey || NEM || align=right | 2.8 km || 
|-id=078 bgcolor=#d6d6d6
| 291078 ||  || — || December 27, 2005 || Mount Lemmon || Mount Lemmon Survey || EOS || align=right | 2.8 km || 
|-id=079 bgcolor=#fefefe
| 291079 ||  || — || December 27, 2005 || Mount Lemmon || Mount Lemmon Survey || NYS || align=right data-sort-value="0.70" | 700 m || 
|-id=080 bgcolor=#d6d6d6
| 291080 ||  || — || December 27, 2005 || Kitt Peak || Spacewatch || — || align=right | 3.4 km || 
|-id=081 bgcolor=#d6d6d6
| 291081 ||  || — || December 27, 2005 || Mount Lemmon || Mount Lemmon Survey || — || align=right | 4.8 km || 
|-id=082 bgcolor=#E9E9E9
| 291082 ||  || — || December 28, 2005 || Kitt Peak || Spacewatch || — || align=right | 2.3 km || 
|-id=083 bgcolor=#fefefe
| 291083 ||  || — || December 24, 2005 || Socorro || LINEAR || — || align=right | 1.2 km || 
|-id=084 bgcolor=#d6d6d6
| 291084 ||  || — || December 24, 2005 || Kitt Peak || Spacewatch || — || align=right | 2.8 km || 
|-id=085 bgcolor=#E9E9E9
| 291085 ||  || — || December 24, 2005 || Kitt Peak || Spacewatch || — || align=right | 3.4 km || 
|-id=086 bgcolor=#d6d6d6
| 291086 ||  || — || January 26, 2001 || Kitt Peak || Spacewatch || HYG || align=right | 2.7 km || 
|-id=087 bgcolor=#d6d6d6
| 291087 ||  || — || December 25, 2005 || Mount Lemmon || Mount Lemmon Survey || — || align=right | 3.4 km || 
|-id=088 bgcolor=#d6d6d6
| 291088 ||  || — || December 25, 2005 || Mount Lemmon || Mount Lemmon Survey || — || align=right | 2.8 km || 
|-id=089 bgcolor=#fefefe
| 291089 ||  || — || December 26, 2005 || Kitt Peak || Spacewatch || NYS || align=right data-sort-value="0.73" | 730 m || 
|-id=090 bgcolor=#E9E9E9
| 291090 ||  || — || December 26, 2005 || Kitt Peak || Spacewatch || — || align=right data-sort-value="0.95" | 950 m || 
|-id=091 bgcolor=#d6d6d6
| 291091 ||  || — || December 26, 2005 || Kitt Peak || Spacewatch || — || align=right | 4.1 km || 
|-id=092 bgcolor=#E9E9E9
| 291092 ||  || — || December 26, 2005 || Kitt Peak || Spacewatch || — || align=right | 1.7 km || 
|-id=093 bgcolor=#E9E9E9
| 291093 ||  || — || December 26, 2005 || Kitt Peak || Spacewatch || — || align=right | 2.3 km || 
|-id=094 bgcolor=#fefefe
| 291094 ||  || — || December 26, 2005 || Kitt Peak || Spacewatch || — || align=right | 1.1 km || 
|-id=095 bgcolor=#fefefe
| 291095 ||  || — || December 26, 2005 || Kitt Peak || Spacewatch || V || align=right data-sort-value="0.83" | 830 m || 
|-id=096 bgcolor=#E9E9E9
| 291096 ||  || — || December 26, 2005 || Kitt Peak || Spacewatch || — || align=right | 3.2 km || 
|-id=097 bgcolor=#fefefe
| 291097 ||  || — || December 26, 2005 || Kitt Peak || Spacewatch || FLO || align=right data-sort-value="0.76" | 760 m || 
|-id=098 bgcolor=#fefefe
| 291098 ||  || — || December 28, 2005 || Mount Lemmon || Mount Lemmon Survey || — || align=right | 1.2 km || 
|-id=099 bgcolor=#fefefe
| 291099 ||  || — || December 25, 2005 || Kitt Peak || Spacewatch || NYS || align=right data-sort-value="0.91" | 910 m || 
|-id=100 bgcolor=#E9E9E9
| 291100 ||  || — || December 25, 2005 || Kitt Peak || Spacewatch || AGN || align=right | 1.5 km || 
|}

291101–291200 

|-bgcolor=#fefefe
| 291101 ||  || — || December 29, 2005 || Catalina || CSS || — || align=right data-sort-value="0.99" | 990 m || 
|-id=102 bgcolor=#d6d6d6
| 291102 ||  || — || December 29, 2005 || Kitt Peak || Spacewatch || — || align=right | 4.1 km || 
|-id=103 bgcolor=#d6d6d6
| 291103 ||  || — || December 27, 2005 || Kitt Peak || Spacewatch || — || align=right | 4.3 km || 
|-id=104 bgcolor=#d6d6d6
| 291104 ||  || — || December 27, 2005 || Socorro || LINEAR || — || align=right | 4.6 km || 
|-id=105 bgcolor=#d6d6d6
| 291105 ||  || — || December 29, 2005 || Socorro || LINEAR || — || align=right | 3.5 km || 
|-id=106 bgcolor=#d6d6d6
| 291106 ||  || — || December 30, 2005 || Mount Lemmon || Mount Lemmon Survey || — || align=right | 2.5 km || 
|-id=107 bgcolor=#fefefe
| 291107 ||  || — || December 27, 2005 || Kitt Peak || Spacewatch || — || align=right | 1.3 km || 
|-id=108 bgcolor=#d6d6d6
| 291108 ||  || — || December 27, 2005 || Kitt Peak || Spacewatch || LIX || align=right | 4.3 km || 
|-id=109 bgcolor=#d6d6d6
| 291109 ||  || — || December 24, 2005 || Socorro || LINEAR || TIR || align=right | 4.7 km || 
|-id=110 bgcolor=#E9E9E9
| 291110 ||  || — || December 25, 2005 || Catalina || CSS || — || align=right | 2.1 km || 
|-id=111 bgcolor=#d6d6d6
| 291111 ||  || — || December 29, 2005 || Palomar || NEAT || — || align=right | 4.5 km || 
|-id=112 bgcolor=#fefefe
| 291112 ||  || — || December 22, 2005 || Kitt Peak || Spacewatch || FLO || align=right data-sort-value="0.81" | 810 m || 
|-id=113 bgcolor=#fefefe
| 291113 ||  || — || December 25, 2005 || Kitt Peak || Spacewatch || V || align=right data-sort-value="0.60" | 600 m || 
|-id=114 bgcolor=#fefefe
| 291114 ||  || — || December 27, 2005 || Kitt Peak || Spacewatch || — || align=right data-sort-value="0.79" | 790 m || 
|-id=115 bgcolor=#fefefe
| 291115 ||  || — || December 27, 2005 || Mount Lemmon || Mount Lemmon Survey || — || align=right data-sort-value="0.98" | 980 m || 
|-id=116 bgcolor=#fefefe
| 291116 ||  || — || December 27, 2005 || Catalina || CSS || — || align=right | 2.5 km || 
|-id=117 bgcolor=#fefefe
| 291117 ||  || — || December 29, 2005 || Catalina || CSS || H || align=right data-sort-value="0.55" | 550 m || 
|-id=118 bgcolor=#E9E9E9
| 291118 ||  || — || December 28, 2005 || Mount Lemmon || Mount Lemmon Survey || AGN || align=right | 1.5 km || 
|-id=119 bgcolor=#fefefe
| 291119 ||  || — || December 31, 2005 || Kitt Peak || Spacewatch || NYS || align=right data-sort-value="0.68" | 680 m || 
|-id=120 bgcolor=#fefefe
| 291120 ||  || — || December 25, 2005 || Mount Lemmon || Mount Lemmon Survey || — || align=right data-sort-value="0.99" | 990 m || 
|-id=121 bgcolor=#d6d6d6
| 291121 ||  || — || December 26, 2005 || Mount Lemmon || Mount Lemmon Survey || THM || align=right | 2.7 km || 
|-id=122 bgcolor=#d6d6d6
| 291122 ||  || — || December 26, 2005 || Kitt Peak || Spacewatch || — || align=right | 3.1 km || 
|-id=123 bgcolor=#d6d6d6
| 291123 ||  || — || December 22, 2005 || Kitt Peak || Spacewatch || KOR || align=right | 1.6 km || 
|-id=124 bgcolor=#fefefe
| 291124 ||  || — || December 22, 2005 || Kitt Peak || Spacewatch || — || align=right | 1.1 km || 
|-id=125 bgcolor=#fefefe
| 291125 ||  || — || December 22, 2005 || Kitt Peak || Spacewatch || — || align=right | 1.1 km || 
|-id=126 bgcolor=#d6d6d6
| 291126 ||  || — || December 22, 2005 || Kitt Peak || Spacewatch || THM || align=right | 2.9 km || 
|-id=127 bgcolor=#E9E9E9
| 291127 ||  || — || December 22, 2005 || Kitt Peak || Spacewatch || — || align=right | 2.3 km || 
|-id=128 bgcolor=#d6d6d6
| 291128 ||  || — || December 24, 2005 || Kitt Peak || Spacewatch || KOR || align=right | 2.0 km || 
|-id=129 bgcolor=#d6d6d6
| 291129 ||  || — || December 26, 2005 || Mount Lemmon || Mount Lemmon Survey || — || align=right | 2.6 km || 
|-id=130 bgcolor=#d6d6d6
| 291130 ||  || — || December 28, 2005 || Mount Lemmon || Mount Lemmon Survey || — || align=right | 3.5 km || 
|-id=131 bgcolor=#fefefe
| 291131 ||  || — || December 29, 2005 || Mount Lemmon || Mount Lemmon Survey || MAS || align=right data-sort-value="0.86" | 860 m || 
|-id=132 bgcolor=#d6d6d6
| 291132 ||  || — || December 21, 2005 || Catalina || CSS || — || align=right | 5.5 km || 
|-id=133 bgcolor=#d6d6d6
| 291133 ||  || — || December 28, 2005 || Palomar || NEAT || — || align=right | 4.8 km || 
|-id=134 bgcolor=#d6d6d6
| 291134 ||  || — || December 30, 2005 || Catalina || CSS || — || align=right | 3.3 km || 
|-id=135 bgcolor=#d6d6d6
| 291135 ||  || — || December 29, 2005 || Kitt Peak || Spacewatch || — || align=right | 3.0 km || 
|-id=136 bgcolor=#fefefe
| 291136 ||  || — || December 30, 2005 || Mount Lemmon || Mount Lemmon Survey || FLO || align=right data-sort-value="0.80" | 800 m || 
|-id=137 bgcolor=#fefefe
| 291137 ||  || — || December 31, 2005 || Kitt Peak || Spacewatch || NYS || align=right data-sort-value="0.92" | 920 m || 
|-id=138 bgcolor=#fefefe
| 291138 ||  || — || December 24, 2005 || Kitt Peak || Spacewatch || MAS || align=right data-sort-value="0.71" | 710 m || 
|-id=139 bgcolor=#d6d6d6
| 291139 ||  || — || December 25, 2005 || Mount Lemmon || Mount Lemmon Survey || KOR || align=right | 1.6 km || 
|-id=140 bgcolor=#fefefe
| 291140 ||  || — || December 25, 2005 || Mount Lemmon || Mount Lemmon Survey || — || align=right | 1.2 km || 
|-id=141 bgcolor=#fefefe
| 291141 ||  || — || December 26, 2005 || Kitt Peak || Spacewatch || NYS || align=right data-sort-value="0.59" | 590 m || 
|-id=142 bgcolor=#d6d6d6
| 291142 ||  || — || December 27, 2005 || Kitt Peak || Spacewatch || — || align=right | 3.0 km || 
|-id=143 bgcolor=#d6d6d6
| 291143 ||  || — || December 28, 2005 || Kitt Peak || Spacewatch || KOR || align=right | 1.4 km || 
|-id=144 bgcolor=#fefefe
| 291144 ||  || — || December 28, 2005 || Mount Lemmon || Mount Lemmon Survey || — || align=right data-sort-value="0.60" | 600 m || 
|-id=145 bgcolor=#d6d6d6
| 291145 ||  || — || December 28, 2005 || Kitt Peak || Spacewatch || — || align=right | 2.8 km || 
|-id=146 bgcolor=#E9E9E9
| 291146 ||  || — || December 30, 2005 || Kitt Peak || Spacewatch || BRU || align=right | 4.3 km || 
|-id=147 bgcolor=#d6d6d6
| 291147 ||  || — || December 28, 2005 || Kitt Peak || Spacewatch || KOR || align=right | 1.4 km || 
|-id=148 bgcolor=#fefefe
| 291148 ||  || — || December 30, 2005 || Kitt Peak || Spacewatch || V || align=right data-sort-value="0.64" | 640 m || 
|-id=149 bgcolor=#d6d6d6
| 291149 ||  || — || December 30, 2005 || Kitt Peak || Spacewatch || EOS || align=right | 2.5 km || 
|-id=150 bgcolor=#d6d6d6
| 291150 ||  || — || December 25, 2005 || Kitt Peak || Spacewatch || THM || align=right | 2.5 km || 
|-id=151 bgcolor=#E9E9E9
| 291151 ||  || — || December 26, 2005 || Kitt Peak || Spacewatch || — || align=right | 1.2 km || 
|-id=152 bgcolor=#d6d6d6
| 291152 ||  || — || December 30, 2005 || Mount Lemmon || Mount Lemmon Survey || — || align=right | 5.3 km || 
|-id=153 bgcolor=#d6d6d6
| 291153 ||  || — || December 28, 2005 || Mount Lemmon || Mount Lemmon Survey || — || align=right | 2.5 km || 
|-id=154 bgcolor=#fefefe
| 291154 ||  || — || December 30, 2005 || Kitt Peak || Spacewatch || NYS || align=right | 1.1 km || 
|-id=155 bgcolor=#d6d6d6
| 291155 ||  || — || December 30, 2005 || Kitt Peak || Spacewatch || — || align=right | 2.9 km || 
|-id=156 bgcolor=#d6d6d6
| 291156 ||  || — || December 30, 2005 || Kitt Peak || Spacewatch || — || align=right | 3.2 km || 
|-id=157 bgcolor=#fefefe
| 291157 ||  || — || December 25, 2005 || Kitt Peak || Spacewatch || — || align=right data-sort-value="0.78" | 780 m || 
|-id=158 bgcolor=#d6d6d6
| 291158 ||  || — || December 26, 2005 || Mount Lemmon || Mount Lemmon Survey || KOR || align=right | 1.3 km || 
|-id=159 bgcolor=#E9E9E9
| 291159 ||  || — || December 26, 2005 || Mount Lemmon || Mount Lemmon Survey || HOF || align=right | 2.7 km || 
|-id=160 bgcolor=#E9E9E9
| 291160 || 2006 AE || — || January 2, 2006 || 7300 Observatory || W. K. Y. Yeung || — || align=right | 1.9 km || 
|-id=161 bgcolor=#d6d6d6
| 291161 ||  || — || January 4, 2006 || Kitt Peak || Spacewatch || — || align=right | 3.2 km || 
|-id=162 bgcolor=#d6d6d6
| 291162 ||  || — || January 5, 2006 || Catalina || CSS || — || align=right | 5.1 km || 
|-id=163 bgcolor=#d6d6d6
| 291163 ||  || — || January 2, 2006 || Mount Lemmon || Mount Lemmon Survey || — || align=right | 4.6 km || 
|-id=164 bgcolor=#d6d6d6
| 291164 ||  || — || January 5, 2006 || Mount Lemmon || Mount Lemmon Survey || — || align=right | 2.3 km || 
|-id=165 bgcolor=#fefefe
| 291165 ||  || — || January 5, 2006 || Mount Lemmon || Mount Lemmon Survey || H || align=right data-sort-value="0.91" | 910 m || 
|-id=166 bgcolor=#d6d6d6
| 291166 ||  || — || January 4, 2006 || Kitt Peak || Spacewatch || NAE || align=right | 3.1 km || 
|-id=167 bgcolor=#fefefe
| 291167 ||  || — || January 5, 2006 || Kitt Peak || Spacewatch || — || align=right | 1.1 km || 
|-id=168 bgcolor=#fefefe
| 291168 ||  || — || January 5, 2006 || Kitt Peak || Spacewatch || — || align=right data-sort-value="0.76" | 760 m || 
|-id=169 bgcolor=#d6d6d6
| 291169 ||  || — || January 5, 2006 || Kitt Peak || Spacewatch || KAR || align=right | 1.4 km || 
|-id=170 bgcolor=#fefefe
| 291170 ||  || — || January 5, 2006 || Kitt Peak || Spacewatch || — || align=right data-sort-value="0.76" | 760 m || 
|-id=171 bgcolor=#E9E9E9
| 291171 ||  || — || January 6, 2006 || Kitt Peak || Spacewatch || HOF || align=right | 2.8 km || 
|-id=172 bgcolor=#d6d6d6
| 291172 ||  || — || January 6, 2006 || Socorro || LINEAR || HYG || align=right | 3.2 km || 
|-id=173 bgcolor=#d6d6d6
| 291173 ||  || — || January 6, 2006 || Catalina || CSS || — || align=right | 4.2 km || 
|-id=174 bgcolor=#d6d6d6
| 291174 ||  || — || January 6, 2006 || Kitt Peak || Spacewatch || — || align=right | 3.0 km || 
|-id=175 bgcolor=#fefefe
| 291175 ||  || — || January 4, 2006 || Kitt Peak || Spacewatch || MAS || align=right data-sort-value="0.89" | 890 m || 
|-id=176 bgcolor=#d6d6d6
| 291176 ||  || — || January 7, 2006 || Mount Lemmon || Mount Lemmon Survey || THM || align=right | 2.4 km || 
|-id=177 bgcolor=#fefefe
| 291177 ||  || — || January 7, 2006 || Mount Lemmon || Mount Lemmon Survey || — || align=right data-sort-value="0.73" | 730 m || 
|-id=178 bgcolor=#E9E9E9
| 291178 ||  || — || January 6, 2006 || Kitt Peak || Spacewatch || — || align=right | 3.6 km || 
|-id=179 bgcolor=#E9E9E9
| 291179 ||  || — || January 7, 2006 || Kitt Peak || Spacewatch || — || align=right | 2.6 km || 
|-id=180 bgcolor=#fefefe
| 291180 ||  || — || January 7, 2006 || Mount Lemmon || Mount Lemmon Survey || MAS || align=right data-sort-value="0.77" | 770 m || 
|-id=181 bgcolor=#fefefe
| 291181 ||  || — || January 2, 2006 || Mount Lemmon || Mount Lemmon Survey || — || align=right data-sort-value="0.87" | 870 m || 
|-id=182 bgcolor=#d6d6d6
| 291182 ||  || — || January 5, 2006 || Kitt Peak || Spacewatch || — || align=right | 3.0 km || 
|-id=183 bgcolor=#E9E9E9
| 291183 ||  || — || January 5, 2006 || Kitt Peak || Spacewatch || — || align=right | 3.1 km || 
|-id=184 bgcolor=#fefefe
| 291184 ||  || — || January 5, 2006 || Kitt Peak || Spacewatch || MAS || align=right data-sort-value="0.83" | 830 m || 
|-id=185 bgcolor=#d6d6d6
| 291185 ||  || — || January 5, 2006 || Kitt Peak || Spacewatch || KOR || align=right | 1.4 km || 
|-id=186 bgcolor=#d6d6d6
| 291186 ||  || — || January 5, 2006 || Kitt Peak || Spacewatch || — || align=right | 2.6 km || 
|-id=187 bgcolor=#fefefe
| 291187 ||  || — || January 5, 2006 || Kitt Peak || Spacewatch || V || align=right data-sort-value="0.69" | 690 m || 
|-id=188 bgcolor=#fefefe
| 291188 ||  || — || January 5, 2006 || Kitt Peak || Spacewatch || FLO || align=right data-sort-value="0.94" | 940 m || 
|-id=189 bgcolor=#d6d6d6
| 291189 ||  || — || January 5, 2006 || Kitt Peak || Spacewatch || EOS || align=right | 3.1 km || 
|-id=190 bgcolor=#fefefe
| 291190 ||  || — || January 8, 2006 || Mount Lemmon || Mount Lemmon Survey || — || align=right data-sort-value="0.71" | 710 m || 
|-id=191 bgcolor=#E9E9E9
| 291191 ||  || — || January 8, 2006 || Mount Lemmon || Mount Lemmon Survey || — || align=right data-sort-value="0.82" | 820 m || 
|-id=192 bgcolor=#d6d6d6
| 291192 ||  || — || January 5, 2006 || Kitt Peak || Spacewatch || — || align=right | 2.4 km || 
|-id=193 bgcolor=#d6d6d6
| 291193 ||  || — || January 6, 2006 || Kitt Peak || Spacewatch || — || align=right | 3.9 km || 
|-id=194 bgcolor=#fefefe
| 291194 ||  || — || January 6, 2006 || Kitt Peak || Spacewatch || NYS || align=right data-sort-value="0.73" | 730 m || 
|-id=195 bgcolor=#d6d6d6
| 291195 ||  || — || January 6, 2006 || Mount Lemmon || Mount Lemmon Survey || HIL3:2 || align=right | 7.1 km || 
|-id=196 bgcolor=#d6d6d6
| 291196 ||  || — || January 8, 2006 || Kitt Peak || Spacewatch || KOR || align=right | 1.4 km || 
|-id=197 bgcolor=#d6d6d6
| 291197 ||  || — || January 8, 2006 || Kitt Peak || Spacewatch || THM || align=right | 2.3 km || 
|-id=198 bgcolor=#fefefe
| 291198 ||  || — || January 6, 2006 || Mount Lemmon || Mount Lemmon Survey || NYS || align=right data-sort-value="0.71" | 710 m || 
|-id=199 bgcolor=#fefefe
| 291199 ||  || — || January 6, 2006 || Kitt Peak || Spacewatch || — || align=right | 1.1 km || 
|-id=200 bgcolor=#fefefe
| 291200 ||  || — || January 8, 2006 || Mount Lemmon || Mount Lemmon Survey || FLO || align=right data-sort-value="0.65" | 650 m || 
|}

291201–291300 

|-bgcolor=#d6d6d6
| 291201 ||  || — || January 6, 2006 || Socorro || LINEAR || — || align=right | 5.8 km || 
|-id=202 bgcolor=#d6d6d6
| 291202 ||  || — || January 6, 2006 || Kitt Peak || Spacewatch || EOS || align=right | 2.3 km || 
|-id=203 bgcolor=#d6d6d6
| 291203 ||  || — || January 4, 2006 || Kitt Peak || Spacewatch || HYG || align=right | 2.9 km || 
|-id=204 bgcolor=#fefefe
| 291204 ||  || — || January 5, 2006 || Mount Lemmon || Mount Lemmon Survey || — || align=right data-sort-value="0.78" | 780 m || 
|-id=205 bgcolor=#fefefe
| 291205 ||  || — || January 6, 2006 || Mount Lemmon || Mount Lemmon Survey || NYS || align=right data-sort-value="0.60" | 600 m || 
|-id=206 bgcolor=#fefefe
| 291206 ||  || — || January 6, 2006 || Mount Lemmon || Mount Lemmon Survey || — || align=right data-sort-value="0.89" | 890 m || 
|-id=207 bgcolor=#E9E9E9
| 291207 ||  || — || January 2, 2006 || Mount Lemmon || Mount Lemmon Survey || — || align=right | 2.5 km || 
|-id=208 bgcolor=#fefefe
| 291208 ||  || — || January 8, 2006 || Catalina || CSS || — || align=right | 2.3 km || 
|-id=209 bgcolor=#d6d6d6
| 291209 ||  || — || January 6, 2006 || Catalina || CSS || — || align=right | 4.6 km || 
|-id=210 bgcolor=#d6d6d6
| 291210 ||  || — || January 6, 2006 || Catalina || CSS || — || align=right | 6.4 km || 
|-id=211 bgcolor=#fefefe
| 291211 ||  || — || January 5, 2006 || Mount Lemmon || Mount Lemmon Survey || — || align=right data-sort-value="0.92" | 920 m || 
|-id=212 bgcolor=#d6d6d6
| 291212 ||  || — || January 7, 2006 || Kitt Peak || Spacewatch || HYG || align=right | 4.0 km || 
|-id=213 bgcolor=#fefefe
| 291213 ||  || — || January 5, 2006 || Mount Lemmon || Mount Lemmon Survey || MAS || align=right data-sort-value="0.78" | 780 m || 
|-id=214 bgcolor=#fefefe
| 291214 ||  || — || January 5, 2006 || Mount Lemmon || Mount Lemmon Survey || NYS || align=right data-sort-value="0.69" | 690 m || 
|-id=215 bgcolor=#E9E9E9
| 291215 ||  || — || January 5, 2006 || Mount Lemmon || Mount Lemmon Survey || — || align=right | 1.0 km || 
|-id=216 bgcolor=#d6d6d6
| 291216 ||  || — || January 5, 2006 || Mount Lemmon || Mount Lemmon Survey || HYG || align=right | 3.5 km || 
|-id=217 bgcolor=#fefefe
| 291217 ||  || — || January 7, 2006 || Mount Lemmon || Mount Lemmon Survey || — || align=right | 2.3 km || 
|-id=218 bgcolor=#fefefe
| 291218 ||  || — || January 7, 2006 || Mount Lemmon || Mount Lemmon Survey || MAS || align=right data-sort-value="0.82" | 820 m || 
|-id=219 bgcolor=#fefefe
| 291219 ||  || — || January 7, 2006 || Mount Lemmon || Mount Lemmon Survey || NYS || align=right data-sort-value="0.76" | 760 m || 
|-id=220 bgcolor=#d6d6d6
| 291220 ||  || — || January 18, 2006 || Catalina || CSS || — || align=right | 2.4 km || 
|-id=221 bgcolor=#fefefe
| 291221 ||  || — || January 20, 2006 || Kitt Peak || Spacewatch || — || align=right data-sort-value="0.97" | 970 m || 
|-id=222 bgcolor=#d6d6d6
| 291222 ||  || — || January 21, 2006 || Mount Lemmon || Mount Lemmon Survey || HYG || align=right | 3.5 km || 
|-id=223 bgcolor=#fefefe
| 291223 ||  || — || January 21, 2006 || Anderson Mesa || LONEOS || — || align=right | 1.2 km || 
|-id=224 bgcolor=#fefefe
| 291224 ||  || — || January 20, 2006 || Kitt Peak || Spacewatch || NYS || align=right data-sort-value="0.88" | 880 m || 
|-id=225 bgcolor=#E9E9E9
| 291225 ||  || — || January 22, 2006 || Junk Bond || D. Healy || — || align=right | 3.6 km || 
|-id=226 bgcolor=#fefefe
| 291226 ||  || — || January 20, 2006 || Kitt Peak || Spacewatch || — || align=right | 1.0 km || 
|-id=227 bgcolor=#E9E9E9
| 291227 ||  || — || January 22, 2006 || Mount Lemmon || Mount Lemmon Survey || — || align=right | 2.9 km || 
|-id=228 bgcolor=#fefefe
| 291228 ||  || — || January 22, 2006 || Anderson Mesa || LONEOS || — || align=right | 1.1 km || 
|-id=229 bgcolor=#fefefe
| 291229 ||  || — || January 22, 2006 || Mount Lemmon || Mount Lemmon Survey || NYS || align=right data-sort-value="0.76" | 760 m || 
|-id=230 bgcolor=#fefefe
| 291230 ||  || — || January 22, 2006 || Mount Lemmon || Mount Lemmon Survey || — || align=right | 1.5 km || 
|-id=231 bgcolor=#d6d6d6
| 291231 ||  || — || January 23, 2006 || Mount Lemmon || Mount Lemmon Survey || — || align=right | 4.2 km || 
|-id=232 bgcolor=#E9E9E9
| 291232 ||  || — || January 23, 2006 || Mount Lemmon || Mount Lemmon Survey || NEM || align=right | 2.4 km || 
|-id=233 bgcolor=#fefefe
| 291233 ||  || — || January 23, 2006 || Nyukasa || Mount Nyukasa Stn. || — || align=right | 1.0 km || 
|-id=234 bgcolor=#d6d6d6
| 291234 ||  || — || January 20, 2006 || Kitt Peak || Spacewatch || — || align=right | 3.4 km || 
|-id=235 bgcolor=#fefefe
| 291235 ||  || — || January 20, 2006 || Kitt Peak || Spacewatch || — || align=right data-sort-value="0.83" | 830 m || 
|-id=236 bgcolor=#d6d6d6
| 291236 ||  || — || January 20, 2006 || Kitt Peak || Spacewatch || EOS || align=right | 2.8 km || 
|-id=237 bgcolor=#fefefe
| 291237 ||  || — || January 21, 2006 || Kitt Peak || Spacewatch || — || align=right | 1.3 km || 
|-id=238 bgcolor=#d6d6d6
| 291238 ||  || — || January 22, 2006 || Mount Lemmon || Mount Lemmon Survey || — || align=right | 2.5 km || 
|-id=239 bgcolor=#d6d6d6
| 291239 ||  || — || January 23, 2006 || Kitt Peak || Spacewatch || — || align=right | 4.7 km || 
|-id=240 bgcolor=#d6d6d6
| 291240 ||  || — || January 24, 2006 || Socorro || LINEAR || HYG || align=right | 4.0 km || 
|-id=241 bgcolor=#fefefe
| 291241 ||  || — || January 22, 2006 || Mount Lemmon || Mount Lemmon Survey || — || align=right data-sort-value="0.96" | 960 m || 
|-id=242 bgcolor=#d6d6d6
| 291242 ||  || — || January 23, 2006 || Kitt Peak || Spacewatch || EOS || align=right | 2.9 km || 
|-id=243 bgcolor=#fefefe
| 291243 ||  || — || January 23, 2006 || Kitt Peak || Spacewatch || NYS || align=right data-sort-value="0.78" | 780 m || 
|-id=244 bgcolor=#E9E9E9
| 291244 ||  || — || January 23, 2006 || Mount Lemmon || Mount Lemmon Survey || — || align=right | 3.5 km || 
|-id=245 bgcolor=#fefefe
| 291245 ||  || — || January 23, 2006 || Mount Lemmon || Mount Lemmon Survey || MAS || align=right data-sort-value="0.74" | 740 m || 
|-id=246 bgcolor=#E9E9E9
| 291246 ||  || — || January 25, 2006 || Kitt Peak || Spacewatch || — || align=right | 2.3 km || 
|-id=247 bgcolor=#d6d6d6
| 291247 ||  || — || January 25, 2006 || Kitt Peak || Spacewatch || THM || align=right | 2.6 km || 
|-id=248 bgcolor=#d6d6d6
| 291248 ||  || — || January 25, 2006 || Kitt Peak || Spacewatch || — || align=right | 2.7 km || 
|-id=249 bgcolor=#E9E9E9
| 291249 ||  || — || January 25, 2006 || Kitt Peak || Spacewatch || — || align=right | 1.4 km || 
|-id=250 bgcolor=#d6d6d6
| 291250 ||  || — || January 25, 2006 || Kitt Peak || Spacewatch || — || align=right | 3.1 km || 
|-id=251 bgcolor=#C2FFFF
| 291251 ||  || — || January 25, 2006 || Kitt Peak || Spacewatch || L5 || align=right | 9.9 km || 
|-id=252 bgcolor=#FA8072
| 291252 ||  || — || January 25, 2006 || Kitt Peak || Spacewatch || — || align=right | 1.2 km || 
|-id=253 bgcolor=#d6d6d6
| 291253 ||  || — || January 25, 2006 || Kitt Peak || Spacewatch || — || align=right | 3.2 km || 
|-id=254 bgcolor=#fefefe
| 291254 ||  || — || January 25, 2006 || Kitt Peak || Spacewatch || FLO || align=right data-sort-value="0.99" | 990 m || 
|-id=255 bgcolor=#C2FFFF
| 291255 ||  || — || January 26, 2006 || Mount Lemmon || Mount Lemmon Survey || L5 || align=right | 14 km || 
|-id=256 bgcolor=#fefefe
| 291256 ||  || — || January 22, 2006 || Mount Lemmon || Mount Lemmon Survey || — || align=right data-sort-value="0.74" | 740 m || 
|-id=257 bgcolor=#fefefe
| 291257 ||  || — || January 23, 2006 || Kitt Peak || Spacewatch || NYS || align=right data-sort-value="0.77" | 770 m || 
|-id=258 bgcolor=#d6d6d6
| 291258 ||  || — || January 26, 2006 || Kitt Peak || Spacewatch || — || align=right | 4.4 km || 
|-id=259 bgcolor=#fefefe
| 291259 ||  || — || January 23, 2006 || Kitt Peak || Spacewatch || — || align=right | 1.1 km || 
|-id=260 bgcolor=#C2FFFF
| 291260 ||  || — || January 23, 2006 || Kitt Peak || Spacewatch || L5 || align=right | 9.1 km || 
|-id=261 bgcolor=#d6d6d6
| 291261 ||  || — || January 23, 2006 || Kitt Peak || Spacewatch || — || align=right | 2.8 km || 
|-id=262 bgcolor=#E9E9E9
| 291262 ||  || — || January 23, 2006 || Kitt Peak || Spacewatch || — || align=right | 1.7 km || 
|-id=263 bgcolor=#fefefe
| 291263 ||  || — || January 23, 2006 || Kitt Peak || Spacewatch || KLI || align=right | 2.2 km || 
|-id=264 bgcolor=#d6d6d6
| 291264 ||  || — || January 23, 2006 || Kitt Peak || Spacewatch || KOR || align=right | 1.7 km || 
|-id=265 bgcolor=#fefefe
| 291265 ||  || — || January 23, 2006 || Kitt Peak || Spacewatch || — || align=right data-sort-value="0.81" | 810 m || 
|-id=266 bgcolor=#d6d6d6
| 291266 ||  || — || January 24, 2006 || Kitt Peak || Spacewatch || EUP || align=right | 6.9 km || 
|-id=267 bgcolor=#fefefe
| 291267 ||  || — || January 25, 2006 || Kitt Peak || Spacewatch || — || align=right | 1.3 km || 
|-id=268 bgcolor=#d6d6d6
| 291268 ||  || — || January 25, 2006 || Kitt Peak || Spacewatch || — || align=right | 5.1 km || 
|-id=269 bgcolor=#E9E9E9
| 291269 ||  || — || January 25, 2006 || Kitt Peak || Spacewatch || — || align=right | 1.5 km || 
|-id=270 bgcolor=#E9E9E9
| 291270 ||  || — || January 25, 2006 || Kitt Peak || Spacewatch || — || align=right | 2.9 km || 
|-id=271 bgcolor=#fefefe
| 291271 ||  || — || January 25, 2006 || Kitt Peak || Spacewatch || FLO || align=right data-sort-value="0.95" | 950 m || 
|-id=272 bgcolor=#fefefe
| 291272 ||  || — || January 26, 2006 || Kitt Peak || Spacewatch || — || align=right data-sort-value="0.77" | 770 m || 
|-id=273 bgcolor=#fefefe
| 291273 ||  || — || January 26, 2006 || Mount Lemmon || Mount Lemmon Survey || FLO || align=right | 1.8 km || 
|-id=274 bgcolor=#E9E9E9
| 291274 ||  || — || January 26, 2006 || Mount Lemmon || Mount Lemmon Survey || — || align=right | 1.0 km || 
|-id=275 bgcolor=#E9E9E9
| 291275 ||  || — || January 26, 2006 || Kitt Peak || Spacewatch || — || align=right | 1.0 km || 
|-id=276 bgcolor=#C2FFFF
| 291276 ||  || — || January 27, 2006 || Mount Lemmon || Mount Lemmon Survey || L5 || align=right | 13 km || 
|-id=277 bgcolor=#fefefe
| 291277 ||  || — || January 22, 2006 || Catalina || CSS || H || align=right data-sort-value="0.73" | 730 m || 
|-id=278 bgcolor=#fefefe
| 291278 ||  || — || January 23, 2006 || Mount Lemmon || Mount Lemmon Survey || NYS || align=right data-sort-value="0.76" | 760 m || 
|-id=279 bgcolor=#fefefe
| 291279 ||  || — || January 25, 2006 || Kitt Peak || Spacewatch || — || align=right data-sort-value="0.86" | 860 m || 
|-id=280 bgcolor=#fefefe
| 291280 ||  || — || January 26, 2006 || Kitt Peak || Spacewatch || NYS || align=right data-sort-value="0.65" | 650 m || 
|-id=281 bgcolor=#fefefe
| 291281 ||  || — || January 26, 2006 || Mount Lemmon || Mount Lemmon Survey || — || align=right data-sort-value="0.72" | 720 m || 
|-id=282 bgcolor=#E9E9E9
| 291282 ||  || — || January 26, 2006 || Kitt Peak || Spacewatch || — || align=right data-sort-value="0.90" | 900 m || 
|-id=283 bgcolor=#fefefe
| 291283 ||  || — || January 26, 2006 || Mount Lemmon || Mount Lemmon Survey || — || align=right data-sort-value="0.98" | 980 m || 
|-id=284 bgcolor=#fefefe
| 291284 ||  || — || January 26, 2006 || Kitt Peak || Spacewatch || — || align=right data-sort-value="0.90" | 900 m || 
|-id=285 bgcolor=#E9E9E9
| 291285 ||  || — || January 26, 2006 || Kitt Peak || Spacewatch || — || align=right | 1.0 km || 
|-id=286 bgcolor=#d6d6d6
| 291286 ||  || — || January 26, 2006 || Kitt Peak || Spacewatch || — || align=right | 2.8 km || 
|-id=287 bgcolor=#E9E9E9
| 291287 ||  || — || January 26, 2006 || Kitt Peak || Spacewatch || — || align=right | 2.7 km || 
|-id=288 bgcolor=#fefefe
| 291288 ||  || — || January 26, 2006 || Kitt Peak || Spacewatch || — || align=right data-sort-value="0.94" | 940 m || 
|-id=289 bgcolor=#fefefe
| 291289 ||  || — || January 26, 2006 || Kitt Peak || Spacewatch || — || align=right | 1.1 km || 
|-id=290 bgcolor=#fefefe
| 291290 ||  || — || January 26, 2006 || Kitt Peak || Spacewatch || FLO || align=right data-sort-value="0.48" | 480 m || 
|-id=291 bgcolor=#d6d6d6
| 291291 ||  || — || January 26, 2006 || Kitt Peak || Spacewatch || HYG || align=right | 4.1 km || 
|-id=292 bgcolor=#fefefe
| 291292 ||  || — || January 26, 2006 || Kitt Peak || Spacewatch || NYS || align=right data-sort-value="0.71" | 710 m || 
|-id=293 bgcolor=#fefefe
| 291293 ||  || — || January 26, 2006 || Kitt Peak || Spacewatch || — || align=right | 1.2 km || 
|-id=294 bgcolor=#fefefe
| 291294 ||  || — || January 26, 2006 || Kitt Peak || Spacewatch || NYS || align=right data-sort-value="0.83" | 830 m || 
|-id=295 bgcolor=#fefefe
| 291295 ||  || — || January 27, 2006 || Mount Lemmon || Mount Lemmon Survey || — || align=right data-sort-value="0.76" | 760 m || 
|-id=296 bgcolor=#fefefe
| 291296 ||  || — || January 28, 2006 || Mount Lemmon || Mount Lemmon Survey || — || align=right | 1.1 km || 
|-id=297 bgcolor=#C2FFFF
| 291297 ||  || — || January 28, 2006 || Mount Lemmon || Mount Lemmon Survey || L5 || align=right | 15 km || 
|-id=298 bgcolor=#E9E9E9
| 291298 ||  || — || January 28, 2006 || Mount Lemmon || Mount Lemmon Survey || HOF || align=right | 3.1 km || 
|-id=299 bgcolor=#d6d6d6
| 291299 ||  || — || January 23, 2006 || Catalina || CSS || EUP || align=right | 5.2 km || 
|-id=300 bgcolor=#E9E9E9
| 291300 ||  || — || January 26, 2006 || Mount Lemmon || Mount Lemmon Survey || — || align=right | 2.0 km || 
|}

291301–291400 

|-bgcolor=#C2FFFF
| 291301 ||  || — || January 26, 2006 || Kitt Peak || Spacewatch || L5 || align=right | 14 km || 
|-id=302 bgcolor=#d6d6d6
| 291302 ||  || — || January 26, 2006 || Kitt Peak || Spacewatch || — || align=right | 3.7 km || 
|-id=303 bgcolor=#fefefe
| 291303 ||  || — || January 23, 2006 || Socorro || LINEAR || — || align=right data-sort-value="0.91" | 910 m || 
|-id=304 bgcolor=#d6d6d6
| 291304 ||  || — || January 26, 2006 || Mount Lemmon || Mount Lemmon Survey || — || align=right | 2.5 km || 
|-id=305 bgcolor=#fefefe
| 291305 ||  || — || January 24, 2006 || Anderson Mesa || LONEOS || V || align=right data-sort-value="0.94" | 940 m || 
|-id=306 bgcolor=#d6d6d6
| 291306 ||  || — || January 25, 2006 || Kitt Peak || Spacewatch || KOR || align=right | 1.4 km || 
|-id=307 bgcolor=#fefefe
| 291307 ||  || — || January 25, 2006 || Kitt Peak || Spacewatch || NYS || align=right | 1.1 km || 
|-id=308 bgcolor=#d6d6d6
| 291308 ||  || — || January 25, 2006 || Kitt Peak || Spacewatch || — || align=right | 2.9 km || 
|-id=309 bgcolor=#E9E9E9
| 291309 ||  || — || January 25, 2006 || Kitt Peak || Spacewatch || — || align=right | 1.5 km || 
|-id=310 bgcolor=#E9E9E9
| 291310 ||  || — || January 25, 2006 || Kitt Peak || Spacewatch || — || align=right | 2.0 km || 
|-id=311 bgcolor=#fefefe
| 291311 ||  || — || January 25, 2006 || Kitt Peak || Spacewatch || MAS || align=right data-sort-value="0.70" | 700 m || 
|-id=312 bgcolor=#fefefe
| 291312 ||  || — || January 25, 2006 || Kitt Peak || Spacewatch || V || align=right data-sort-value="0.78" | 780 m || 
|-id=313 bgcolor=#d6d6d6
| 291313 ||  || — || January 26, 2006 || Kitt Peak || Spacewatch || — || align=right | 2.6 km || 
|-id=314 bgcolor=#d6d6d6
| 291314 ||  || — || January 26, 2006 || Mount Lemmon || Mount Lemmon Survey || — || align=right | 2.7 km || 
|-id=315 bgcolor=#fefefe
| 291315 ||  || — || January 26, 2006 || Kitt Peak || Spacewatch || — || align=right data-sort-value="0.96" | 960 m || 
|-id=316 bgcolor=#C2FFFF
| 291316 ||  || — || January 26, 2006 || Mount Lemmon || Mount Lemmon Survey || L5010 || align=right | 11 km || 
|-id=317 bgcolor=#fefefe
| 291317 ||  || — || January 26, 2006 || Mount Lemmon || Mount Lemmon Survey || — || align=right | 1.6 km || 
|-id=318 bgcolor=#fefefe
| 291318 ||  || — || January 26, 2006 || Mount Lemmon || Mount Lemmon Survey || NYS || align=right data-sort-value="0.74" | 740 m || 
|-id=319 bgcolor=#fefefe
| 291319 ||  || — || January 27, 2006 || Kitt Peak || Spacewatch || V || align=right data-sort-value="0.83" | 830 m || 
|-id=320 bgcolor=#fefefe
| 291320 ||  || — || January 27, 2006 || Kitt Peak || Spacewatch || MAS || align=right data-sort-value="0.81" | 810 m || 
|-id=321 bgcolor=#fefefe
| 291321 ||  || — || January 27, 2006 || Kitt Peak || Spacewatch || NYS || align=right | 1.6 km || 
|-id=322 bgcolor=#d6d6d6
| 291322 ||  || — || January 27, 2006 || Mount Lemmon || Mount Lemmon Survey || — || align=right | 2.9 km || 
|-id=323 bgcolor=#fefefe
| 291323 ||  || — || January 27, 2006 || Anderson Mesa || LONEOS || NYS || align=right data-sort-value="0.95" | 950 m || 
|-id=324 bgcolor=#E9E9E9
| 291324 ||  || — || January 28, 2006 || Mount Lemmon || Mount Lemmon Survey || ADE || align=right | 2.7 km || 
|-id=325 bgcolor=#E9E9E9
| 291325 de Tyard ||  ||  || January 29, 2006 || Nogales || J.-C. Merlin || — || align=right | 1.1 km || 
|-id=326 bgcolor=#fefefe
| 291326 ||  || — || January 30, 2006 || Kitt Peak || Spacewatch || MAS || align=right | 1.6 km || 
|-id=327 bgcolor=#C2FFFF
| 291327 ||  || — || January 30, 2006 || Kitt Peak || Spacewatch || L5 || align=right | 11 km || 
|-id=328 bgcolor=#E9E9E9
| 291328 ||  || — || January 30, 2006 || Kitt Peak || Spacewatch || — || align=right | 1.9 km || 
|-id=329 bgcolor=#fefefe
| 291329 ||  || — || January 30, 2006 || Kitt Peak || Spacewatch || — || align=right data-sort-value="0.98" | 980 m || 
|-id=330 bgcolor=#d6d6d6
| 291330 ||  || — || January 30, 2006 || Kitt Peak || Spacewatch || THM || align=right | 2.7 km || 
|-id=331 bgcolor=#fefefe
| 291331 ||  || — || January 31, 2006 || Mount Lemmon || Mount Lemmon Survey || NYS || align=right data-sort-value="0.59" | 590 m || 
|-id=332 bgcolor=#fefefe
| 291332 ||  || — || January 31, 2006 || Kitt Peak || Spacewatch || NYS || align=right data-sort-value="0.86" | 860 m || 
|-id=333 bgcolor=#fefefe
| 291333 ||  || — || January 31, 2006 || Kitt Peak || Spacewatch || NYS || align=right data-sort-value="0.86" | 860 m || 
|-id=334 bgcolor=#fefefe
| 291334 ||  || — || January 23, 2006 || Catalina || CSS || — || align=right | 1.3 km || 
|-id=335 bgcolor=#fefefe
| 291335 ||  || — || January 23, 2006 || Catalina || CSS || — || align=right data-sort-value="0.93" | 930 m || 
|-id=336 bgcolor=#d6d6d6
| 291336 ||  || — || January 24, 2006 || Socorro || LINEAR || — || align=right | 3.9 km || 
|-id=337 bgcolor=#d6d6d6
| 291337 ||  || — || January 26, 2006 || Catalina || CSS || — || align=right | 4.3 km || 
|-id=338 bgcolor=#d6d6d6
| 291338 ||  || — || January 27, 2006 || Anderson Mesa || LONEOS || — || align=right | 3.7 km || 
|-id=339 bgcolor=#E9E9E9
| 291339 ||  || — || January 23, 2006 || Catalina || CSS || — || align=right | 2.3 km || 
|-id=340 bgcolor=#fefefe
| 291340 ||  || — || January 28, 2006 || Mount Lemmon || Mount Lemmon Survey || NYS || align=right | 1.1 km || 
|-id=341 bgcolor=#d6d6d6
| 291341 ||  || — || January 28, 2006 || Catalina || CSS || — || align=right | 4.2 km || 
|-id=342 bgcolor=#fefefe
| 291342 ||  || — || January 30, 2006 || Kitt Peak || Spacewatch || — || align=right data-sort-value="0.87" | 870 m || 
|-id=343 bgcolor=#E9E9E9
| 291343 ||  || — || January 30, 2006 || Kitt Peak || Spacewatch || — || align=right | 1.2 km || 
|-id=344 bgcolor=#d6d6d6
| 291344 ||  || — || January 30, 2006 || Kitt Peak || Spacewatch || SHU3:2 || align=right | 5.4 km || 
|-id=345 bgcolor=#fefefe
| 291345 ||  || — || January 31, 2006 || Kitt Peak || Spacewatch || MAS || align=right data-sort-value="0.71" | 710 m || 
|-id=346 bgcolor=#d6d6d6
| 291346 ||  || — || January 31, 2006 || Kitt Peak || Spacewatch || — || align=right | 6.1 km || 
|-id=347 bgcolor=#E9E9E9
| 291347 ||  || — || September 3, 1999 || Kitt Peak || Spacewatch || HOF || align=right | 2.5 km || 
|-id=348 bgcolor=#C2FFFF
| 291348 ||  || — || January 31, 2006 || Kitt Peak || Spacewatch || L5 || align=right | 10 km || 
|-id=349 bgcolor=#d6d6d6
| 291349 ||  || — || January 31, 2006 || Kitt Peak || Spacewatch || KOR || align=right | 1.8 km || 
|-id=350 bgcolor=#d6d6d6
| 291350 ||  || — || January 31, 2006 || Kitt Peak || Spacewatch || THM || align=right | 3.0 km || 
|-id=351 bgcolor=#d6d6d6
| 291351 ||  || — || January 31, 2006 || Kitt Peak || Spacewatch || — || align=right | 2.7 km || 
|-id=352 bgcolor=#d6d6d6
| 291352 ||  || — || January 31, 2006 || Mount Lemmon || Mount Lemmon Survey || — || align=right | 5.1 km || 
|-id=353 bgcolor=#fefefe
| 291353 ||  || — || January 31, 2006 || Kitt Peak || Spacewatch || NYS || align=right data-sort-value="0.79" | 790 m || 
|-id=354 bgcolor=#fefefe
| 291354 ||  || — || January 31, 2006 || Kitt Peak || Spacewatch || — || align=right data-sort-value="0.86" | 860 m || 
|-id=355 bgcolor=#fefefe
| 291355 ||  || — || January 31, 2006 || Kitt Peak || Spacewatch || NYS || align=right data-sort-value="0.76" | 760 m || 
|-id=356 bgcolor=#fefefe
| 291356 ||  || — || January 31, 2006 || Kitt Peak || Spacewatch || MAS || align=right data-sort-value="0.64" | 640 m || 
|-id=357 bgcolor=#E9E9E9
| 291357 ||  || — || January 31, 2006 || Kitt Peak || Spacewatch || — || align=right | 1.1 km || 
|-id=358 bgcolor=#E9E9E9
| 291358 ||  || — || January 31, 2006 || Mount Lemmon || Mount Lemmon Survey || — || align=right | 1.2 km || 
|-id=359 bgcolor=#fefefe
| 291359 ||  || — || January 31, 2006 || Kitt Peak || Spacewatch || — || align=right data-sort-value="0.94" | 940 m || 
|-id=360 bgcolor=#E9E9E9
| 291360 ||  || — || January 31, 2006 || Kitt Peak || Spacewatch || — || align=right | 1.3 km || 
|-id=361 bgcolor=#E9E9E9
| 291361 ||  || — || January 31, 2006 || Kitt Peak || Spacewatch || EUN || align=right | 1.4 km || 
|-id=362 bgcolor=#fefefe
| 291362 ||  || — || January 31, 2006 || Kitt Peak || Spacewatch || — || align=right data-sort-value="0.62" | 620 m || 
|-id=363 bgcolor=#E9E9E9
| 291363 ||  || — || January 31, 2006 || Kitt Peak || Spacewatch || — || align=right data-sort-value="0.75" | 750 m || 
|-id=364 bgcolor=#d6d6d6
| 291364 ||  || — || January 31, 2006 || Kitt Peak || Spacewatch || — || align=right | 4.6 km || 
|-id=365 bgcolor=#fefefe
| 291365 ||  || — || January 31, 2006 || Kitt Peak || Spacewatch || — || align=right | 1.2 km || 
|-id=366 bgcolor=#fefefe
| 291366 ||  || — || January 31, 2006 || Kitt Peak || Spacewatch || — || align=right | 1.5 km || 
|-id=367 bgcolor=#fefefe
| 291367 ||  || — || January 31, 2006 || Kitt Peak || Spacewatch || NYS || align=right data-sort-value="0.69" | 690 m || 
|-id=368 bgcolor=#d6d6d6
| 291368 ||  || — || January 26, 2006 || Catalina || CSS || EUP || align=right | 4.8 km || 
|-id=369 bgcolor=#fefefe
| 291369 ||  || — || January 30, 2006 || Kitt Peak || Spacewatch || FLO || align=right data-sort-value="0.71" | 710 m || 
|-id=370 bgcolor=#E9E9E9
| 291370 ||  || — || January 23, 2006 || Mount Lemmon || Mount Lemmon Survey || — || align=right | 1.9 km || 
|-id=371 bgcolor=#fefefe
| 291371 ||  || — || January 30, 2006 || Catalina || CSS || V || align=right data-sort-value="0.87" | 870 m || 
|-id=372 bgcolor=#fefefe
| 291372 ||  || — || January 26, 2006 || Mount Lemmon || Mount Lemmon Survey || — || align=right | 1.4 km || 
|-id=373 bgcolor=#d6d6d6
| 291373 ||  || — || January 30, 2006 || Kitt Peak || Spacewatch || THM || align=right | 2.5 km || 
|-id=374 bgcolor=#fefefe
| 291374 ||  || — || January 30, 2006 || Kitt Peak || Spacewatch || critical || align=right data-sort-value="0.52" | 520 m || 
|-id=375 bgcolor=#E9E9E9
| 291375 ||  || — || January 31, 2006 || Kitt Peak || Spacewatch || — || align=right | 2.9 km || 
|-id=376 bgcolor=#d6d6d6
| 291376 ||  || — || January 26, 2006 || Kitt Peak || Spacewatch || — || align=right | 3.0 km || 
|-id=377 bgcolor=#d6d6d6
| 291377 ||  || — || January 23, 2006 || Kitt Peak || Spacewatch || KOR || align=right | 1.4 km || 
|-id=378 bgcolor=#E9E9E9
| 291378 ||  || — || February 1, 2006 || Mount Lemmon || Mount Lemmon Survey || — || align=right | 2.4 km || 
|-id=379 bgcolor=#d6d6d6
| 291379 ||  || — || February 1, 2006 || Kitt Peak || Spacewatch || — || align=right | 6.7 km || 
|-id=380 bgcolor=#fefefe
| 291380 ||  || — || February 1, 2006 || Kitt Peak || Spacewatch || — || align=right | 1.1 km || 
|-id=381 bgcolor=#d6d6d6
| 291381 ||  || — || February 1, 2006 || Kitt Peak || Spacewatch || HYG || align=right | 3.5 km || 
|-id=382 bgcolor=#fefefe
| 291382 ||  || — || February 1, 2006 || Mount Lemmon || Mount Lemmon Survey || FLO || align=right data-sort-value="0.89" | 890 m || 
|-id=383 bgcolor=#d6d6d6
| 291383 ||  || — || February 2, 2006 || Kitt Peak || Spacewatch || — || align=right | 3.0 km || 
|-id=384 bgcolor=#fefefe
| 291384 ||  || — || February 2, 2006 || Kitt Peak || Spacewatch || — || align=right data-sort-value="0.91" | 910 m || 
|-id=385 bgcolor=#C2FFFF
| 291385 ||  || — || February 2, 2006 || Kitt Peak || Spacewatch || L5 || align=right | 13 km || 
|-id=386 bgcolor=#fefefe
| 291386 ||  || — || February 2, 2006 || Catalina || CSS || V || align=right data-sort-value="0.89" | 890 m || 
|-id=387 bgcolor=#fefefe
| 291387 Katiebouman ||  ||  || February 2, 2006 || Mount Lemmon || Mount Lemmon Survey || — || align=right data-sort-value="0.92" | 920 m || 
|-id=388 bgcolor=#E9E9E9
| 291388 ||  || — || February 2, 2006 || Kitt Peak || Spacewatch || — || align=right | 2.5 km || 
|-id=389 bgcolor=#fefefe
| 291389 ||  || — || February 2, 2006 || Kitt Peak || Spacewatch || V || align=right | 1.1 km || 
|-id=390 bgcolor=#C2FFFF
| 291390 ||  || — || February 2, 2006 || Kitt Peak || Spacewatch || L5 || align=right | 9.5 km || 
|-id=391 bgcolor=#fefefe
| 291391 ||  || — || January 10, 2006 || Mount Lemmon || Mount Lemmon Survey || — || align=right | 1.0 km || 
|-id=392 bgcolor=#fefefe
| 291392 ||  || — || February 3, 2006 || Kitt Peak || Spacewatch || NYS || align=right data-sort-value="0.79" | 790 m || 
|-id=393 bgcolor=#fefefe
| 291393 ||  || — || February 3, 2006 || Kitt Peak || Spacewatch || MAS || align=right data-sort-value="0.70" | 700 m || 
|-id=394 bgcolor=#fefefe
| 291394 ||  || — || February 3, 2006 || Kitt Peak || Spacewatch || MAS || align=right data-sort-value="0.66" | 660 m || 
|-id=395 bgcolor=#fefefe
| 291395 ||  || — || February 3, 2006 || Kitt Peak || Spacewatch || — || align=right data-sort-value="0.75" | 750 m || 
|-id=396 bgcolor=#fefefe
| 291396 ||  || — || February 3, 2006 || Socorro || LINEAR || FLO || align=right | 1.7 km || 
|-id=397 bgcolor=#d6d6d6
| 291397 ||  || — || February 4, 2006 || Kitt Peak || Spacewatch || 7:4 || align=right | 4.5 km || 
|-id=398 bgcolor=#fefefe
| 291398 ||  || — || February 4, 2006 || Mount Lemmon || Mount Lemmon Survey || — || align=right data-sort-value="0.62" | 620 m || 
|-id=399 bgcolor=#fefefe
| 291399 ||  || — || February 11, 2006 || Wrightwood || J. W. Young || V || align=right data-sort-value="0.64" | 640 m || 
|-id=400 bgcolor=#d6d6d6
| 291400 ||  || — || February 2, 2006 || Catalina || CSS || — || align=right | 3.7 km || 
|}

291401–291500 

|-bgcolor=#E9E9E9
| 291401 ||  || — || February 7, 2006 || Catalina || CSS || — || align=right | 2.3 km || 
|-id=402 bgcolor=#fefefe
| 291402 ||  || — || February 3, 2006 || Socorro || LINEAR || — || align=right | 1.2 km || 
|-id=403 bgcolor=#fefefe
| 291403 ||  || — || February 6, 2006 || Kitt Peak || Spacewatch || V || align=right data-sort-value="0.72" | 720 m || 
|-id=404 bgcolor=#E9E9E9
| 291404 ||  || — || February 2, 2006 || Mount Lemmon || Mount Lemmon Survey || — || align=right | 1.2 km || 
|-id=405 bgcolor=#fefefe
| 291405 ||  || — || February 6, 2006 || Mount Lemmon || Mount Lemmon Survey || — || align=right | 1.4 km || 
|-id=406 bgcolor=#E9E9E9
| 291406 ||  || — || February 20, 2006 || Kitt Peak || Spacewatch || — || align=right data-sort-value="0.98" | 980 m || 
|-id=407 bgcolor=#E9E9E9
| 291407 ||  || — || February 20, 2006 || Kitt Peak || Spacewatch || JUN || align=right | 1.4 km || 
|-id=408 bgcolor=#E9E9E9
| 291408 ||  || — || February 20, 2006 || Catalina || CSS || — || align=right | 2.0 km || 
|-id=409 bgcolor=#fefefe
| 291409 ||  || — || February 20, 2006 || Catalina || CSS || ERI || align=right | 1.5 km || 
|-id=410 bgcolor=#d6d6d6
| 291410 ||  || — || February 20, 2006 || Catalina || CSS || — || align=right | 4.6 km || 
|-id=411 bgcolor=#fefefe
| 291411 ||  || — || February 20, 2006 || Catalina || CSS || NYS || align=right data-sort-value="0.78" | 780 m || 
|-id=412 bgcolor=#d6d6d6
| 291412 ||  || — || February 20, 2006 || Catalina || CSS || — || align=right | 4.9 km || 
|-id=413 bgcolor=#d6d6d6
| 291413 ||  || — || February 20, 2006 || Mount Lemmon || Mount Lemmon Survey || — || align=right | 2.4 km || 
|-id=414 bgcolor=#d6d6d6
| 291414 ||  || — || February 20, 2006 || Kitt Peak || Spacewatch || LIX || align=right | 5.9 km || 
|-id=415 bgcolor=#fefefe
| 291415 ||  || — || February 21, 2006 || Catalina || CSS || — || align=right | 1.3 km || 
|-id=416 bgcolor=#E9E9E9
| 291416 ||  || — || February 21, 2006 || Catalina || CSS || — || align=right | 3.3 km || 
|-id=417 bgcolor=#fefefe
| 291417 ||  || — || February 20, 2006 || Kitt Peak || Spacewatch || SUL || align=right | 2.5 km || 
|-id=418 bgcolor=#d6d6d6
| 291418 ||  || — || February 20, 2006 || Mount Lemmon || Mount Lemmon Survey || — || align=right | 3.4 km || 
|-id=419 bgcolor=#d6d6d6
| 291419 ||  || — || February 21, 2006 || Anderson Mesa || LONEOS || LIX || align=right | 6.9 km || 
|-id=420 bgcolor=#E9E9E9
| 291420 ||  || — || February 21, 2006 || Mount Lemmon || Mount Lemmon Survey || ADE || align=right | 2.7 km || 
|-id=421 bgcolor=#fefefe
| 291421 ||  || — || February 21, 2006 || Mount Lemmon || Mount Lemmon Survey || — || align=right data-sort-value="0.91" | 910 m || 
|-id=422 bgcolor=#fefefe
| 291422 ||  || — || February 21, 2006 || Vicques || M. Ory || — || align=right | 1.1 km || 
|-id=423 bgcolor=#fefefe
| 291423 ||  || — || February 20, 2006 || Kitt Peak || Spacewatch || — || align=right | 1.00 km || 
|-id=424 bgcolor=#fefefe
| 291424 ||  || — || February 20, 2006 || Kitt Peak || Spacewatch || MAS || align=right | 1.1 km || 
|-id=425 bgcolor=#d6d6d6
| 291425 ||  || — || February 20, 2006 || Kitt Peak || Spacewatch || K-2 || align=right | 1.7 km || 
|-id=426 bgcolor=#d6d6d6
| 291426 ||  || — || February 20, 2006 || Kitt Peak || Spacewatch || KOR || align=right | 1.5 km || 
|-id=427 bgcolor=#fefefe
| 291427 ||  || — || February 20, 2006 || Catalina || CSS || — || align=right | 1.1 km || 
|-id=428 bgcolor=#fefefe
| 291428 ||  || — || February 20, 2006 || Kitt Peak || Spacewatch || NYS || align=right data-sort-value="0.72" | 720 m || 
|-id=429 bgcolor=#C2FFFF
| 291429 ||  || — || February 20, 2006 || Kitt Peak || Spacewatch || L5 || align=right | 11 km || 
|-id=430 bgcolor=#fefefe
| 291430 ||  || — || February 20, 2006 || Kitt Peak || Spacewatch || — || align=right | 1.0 km || 
|-id=431 bgcolor=#E9E9E9
| 291431 ||  || — || February 20, 2006 || Kitt Peak || Spacewatch || — || align=right data-sort-value="0.93" | 930 m || 
|-id=432 bgcolor=#fefefe
| 291432 ||  || — || February 20, 2006 || Kitt Peak || Spacewatch || — || align=right | 1.1 km || 
|-id=433 bgcolor=#d6d6d6
| 291433 ||  || — || February 20, 2006 || Kitt Peak || Spacewatch || EOS || align=right | 1.6 km || 
|-id=434 bgcolor=#fefefe
| 291434 ||  || — || February 20, 2006 || Kitt Peak || Spacewatch || — || align=right data-sort-value="0.95" | 950 m || 
|-id=435 bgcolor=#d6d6d6
| 291435 ||  || — || February 20, 2006 || Mount Lemmon || Mount Lemmon Survey || — || align=right | 2.4 km || 
|-id=436 bgcolor=#d6d6d6
| 291436 ||  || — || February 20, 2006 || Mount Lemmon || Mount Lemmon Survey || — || align=right | 3.9 km || 
|-id=437 bgcolor=#C2FFFF
| 291437 ||  || — || February 20, 2006 || Mount Lemmon || Mount Lemmon Survey || L5 || align=right | 11 km || 
|-id=438 bgcolor=#E9E9E9
| 291438 ||  || — || February 20, 2006 || Mount Lemmon || Mount Lemmon Survey || — || align=right | 1.6 km || 
|-id=439 bgcolor=#fefefe
| 291439 ||  || — || February 20, 2006 || Kitt Peak || Spacewatch || V || align=right data-sort-value="0.74" | 740 m || 
|-id=440 bgcolor=#E9E9E9
| 291440 ||  || — || February 20, 2006 || Kitt Peak || Spacewatch || — || align=right | 1.9 km || 
|-id=441 bgcolor=#fefefe
| 291441 ||  || — || February 20, 2006 || Kitt Peak || Spacewatch || KLI || align=right | 1.7 km || 
|-id=442 bgcolor=#d6d6d6
| 291442 ||  || — || February 20, 2006 || Kitt Peak || Spacewatch || — || align=right | 3.6 km || 
|-id=443 bgcolor=#fefefe
| 291443 ||  || — || February 20, 2006 || Kitt Peak || Spacewatch || — || align=right | 1.1 km || 
|-id=444 bgcolor=#E9E9E9
| 291444 ||  || — || February 20, 2006 || Kitt Peak || Spacewatch || — || align=right | 1.3 km || 
|-id=445 bgcolor=#fefefe
| 291445 ||  || — || February 20, 2006 || Mount Lemmon || Mount Lemmon Survey || FLO || align=right data-sort-value="0.69" | 690 m || 
|-id=446 bgcolor=#fefefe
| 291446 ||  || — || February 20, 2006 || Mount Lemmon || Mount Lemmon Survey || — || align=right data-sort-value="0.82" | 820 m || 
|-id=447 bgcolor=#E9E9E9
| 291447 ||  || — || February 22, 2006 || Palomar || NEAT || — || align=right | 3.5 km || 
|-id=448 bgcolor=#fefefe
| 291448 ||  || — || February 22, 2006 || Catalina || CSS || FLO || align=right | 1.8 km || 
|-id=449 bgcolor=#E9E9E9
| 291449 ||  || — || February 20, 2006 || Kitt Peak || Spacewatch || HOF || align=right | 3.2 km || 
|-id=450 bgcolor=#fefefe
| 291450 ||  || — || February 20, 2006 || Kitt Peak || Spacewatch || MAS || align=right data-sort-value="0.84" | 840 m || 
|-id=451 bgcolor=#E9E9E9
| 291451 ||  || — || February 20, 2006 || Kitt Peak || Spacewatch || — || align=right | 1.9 km || 
|-id=452 bgcolor=#fefefe
| 291452 ||  || — || February 21, 2006 || Mount Lemmon || Mount Lemmon Survey || NYS || align=right data-sort-value="0.61" | 610 m || 
|-id=453 bgcolor=#d6d6d6
| 291453 ||  || — || February 21, 2006 || Mount Lemmon || Mount Lemmon Survey || — || align=right | 2.4 km || 
|-id=454 bgcolor=#fefefe
| 291454 ||  || — || February 21, 2006 || Mount Lemmon || Mount Lemmon Survey || ERI || align=right | 2.4 km || 
|-id=455 bgcolor=#fefefe
| 291455 ||  || — || February 23, 2006 || Kitt Peak || Spacewatch || NYS || align=right data-sort-value="0.71" | 710 m || 
|-id=456 bgcolor=#fefefe
| 291456 ||  || — || February 23, 2006 || Kitt Peak || Spacewatch || V || align=right data-sort-value="0.99" | 990 m || 
|-id=457 bgcolor=#d6d6d6
| 291457 ||  || — || February 24, 2006 || Kitt Peak || Spacewatch || KOR || align=right | 1.9 km || 
|-id=458 bgcolor=#fefefe
| 291458 ||  || — || February 24, 2006 || Kitt Peak || Spacewatch || NYS || align=right data-sort-value="0.69" | 690 m || 
|-id=459 bgcolor=#fefefe
| 291459 ||  || — || February 24, 2006 || Kitt Peak || Spacewatch || — || align=right data-sort-value="0.72" | 720 m || 
|-id=460 bgcolor=#fefefe
| 291460 ||  || — || February 24, 2006 || Mount Lemmon || Mount Lemmon Survey || — || align=right data-sort-value="0.95" | 950 m || 
|-id=461 bgcolor=#fefefe
| 291461 ||  || — || February 24, 2006 || Kitt Peak || Spacewatch || — || align=right data-sort-value="0.90" | 900 m || 
|-id=462 bgcolor=#fefefe
| 291462 ||  || — || February 24, 2006 || Mount Lemmon || Mount Lemmon Survey || NYS || align=right data-sort-value="0.66" | 660 m || 
|-id=463 bgcolor=#d6d6d6
| 291463 ||  || — || February 24, 2006 || Kitt Peak || Spacewatch || — || align=right | 3.3 km || 
|-id=464 bgcolor=#E9E9E9
| 291464 ||  || — || February 20, 2006 || Socorro || LINEAR || — || align=right | 1.8 km || 
|-id=465 bgcolor=#d6d6d6
| 291465 ||  || — || February 22, 2006 || Catalina || CSS || EMA || align=right | 4.5 km || 
|-id=466 bgcolor=#fefefe
| 291466 ||  || — || February 20, 2006 || Socorro || LINEAR || — || align=right | 1.2 km || 
|-id=467 bgcolor=#fefefe
| 291467 ||  || — || February 23, 2006 || Kitt Peak || Spacewatch || — || align=right data-sort-value="0.98" | 980 m || 
|-id=468 bgcolor=#fefefe
| 291468 ||  || — || February 24, 2006 || Kitt Peak || Spacewatch || — || align=right | 1.00 km || 
|-id=469 bgcolor=#d6d6d6
| 291469 ||  || — || February 24, 2006 || Kitt Peak || Spacewatch || — || align=right | 2.8 km || 
|-id=470 bgcolor=#E9E9E9
| 291470 ||  || — || February 24, 2006 || Kitt Peak || Spacewatch || — || align=right | 1.2 km || 
|-id=471 bgcolor=#C2FFFF
| 291471 ||  || — || February 24, 2006 || Kitt Peak || Spacewatch || L5 || align=right | 9.5 km || 
|-id=472 bgcolor=#d6d6d6
| 291472 ||  || — || February 24, 2006 || Kitt Peak || Spacewatch || — || align=right | 4.7 km || 
|-id=473 bgcolor=#fefefe
| 291473 ||  || — || February 24, 2006 || Kitt Peak || Spacewatch || MAS || align=right data-sort-value="0.94" | 940 m || 
|-id=474 bgcolor=#fefefe
| 291474 ||  || — || February 24, 2006 || Kitt Peak || Spacewatch || — || align=right | 1.2 km || 
|-id=475 bgcolor=#fefefe
| 291475 ||  || — || February 24, 2006 || Kitt Peak || Spacewatch || MAS || align=right data-sort-value="0.79" | 790 m || 
|-id=476 bgcolor=#E9E9E9
| 291476 ||  || — || February 24, 2006 || Mount Lemmon || Mount Lemmon Survey || — || align=right | 2.5 km || 
|-id=477 bgcolor=#E9E9E9
| 291477 ||  || — || February 24, 2006 || Kitt Peak || Spacewatch || — || align=right | 1.7 km || 
|-id=478 bgcolor=#d6d6d6
| 291478 ||  || — || February 24, 2006 || Mount Lemmon || Mount Lemmon Survey || — || align=right | 2.5 km || 
|-id=479 bgcolor=#E9E9E9
| 291479 ||  || — || February 24, 2006 || Kitt Peak || Spacewatch || — || align=right data-sort-value="0.99" | 990 m || 
|-id=480 bgcolor=#E9E9E9
| 291480 ||  || — || February 24, 2006 || Kitt Peak || Spacewatch || AER || align=right | 2.1 km || 
|-id=481 bgcolor=#fefefe
| 291481 ||  || — || February 24, 2006 || Kitt Peak || Spacewatch || — || align=right data-sort-value="0.68" | 680 m || 
|-id=482 bgcolor=#d6d6d6
| 291482 ||  || — || February 24, 2006 || Kitt Peak || Spacewatch || THM || align=right | 2.6 km || 
|-id=483 bgcolor=#d6d6d6
| 291483 ||  || — || February 25, 2006 || Kitt Peak || Spacewatch || — || align=right | 2.6 km || 
|-id=484 bgcolor=#d6d6d6
| 291484 ||  || — || February 25, 2006 || Mount Lemmon || Mount Lemmon Survey || — || align=right | 4.0 km || 
|-id=485 bgcolor=#C2FFFF
| 291485 ||  || — || February 25, 2006 || Mount Lemmon || Mount Lemmon Survey || L5 || align=right | 11 km || 
|-id=486 bgcolor=#d6d6d6
| 291486 ||  || — || February 25, 2006 || Kitt Peak || Spacewatch || — || align=right | 3.8 km || 
|-id=487 bgcolor=#fefefe
| 291487 ||  || — || February 25, 2006 || Kitt Peak || Spacewatch || — || align=right data-sort-value="0.98" | 980 m || 
|-id=488 bgcolor=#fefefe
| 291488 ||  || — || February 25, 2006 || Kitt Peak || Spacewatch || V || align=right data-sort-value="0.76" | 760 m || 
|-id=489 bgcolor=#fefefe
| 291489 ||  || — || February 25, 2006 || Kitt Peak || Spacewatch || — || align=right | 2.1 km || 
|-id=490 bgcolor=#E9E9E9
| 291490 ||  || — || February 27, 2006 || Kitt Peak || Spacewatch || — || align=right | 1.2 km || 
|-id=491 bgcolor=#fefefe
| 291491 ||  || — || February 27, 2006 || Kitt Peak || Spacewatch || V || align=right data-sort-value="0.84" | 840 m || 
|-id=492 bgcolor=#fefefe
| 291492 ||  || — || February 20, 2006 || Socorro || LINEAR || — || align=right | 1.6 km || 
|-id=493 bgcolor=#fefefe
| 291493 ||  || — || February 21, 2006 || Anderson Mesa || LONEOS || V || align=right data-sort-value="0.89" | 890 m || 
|-id=494 bgcolor=#d6d6d6
| 291494 ||  || — || February 21, 2006 || Catalina || CSS || LUT || align=right | 7.3 km || 
|-id=495 bgcolor=#C2FFFF
| 291495 ||  || — || February 25, 2006 || Kitt Peak || Spacewatch || L5 || align=right | 11 km || 
|-id=496 bgcolor=#fefefe
| 291496 ||  || — || February 25, 2006 || Kitt Peak || Spacewatch || — || align=right | 1.4 km || 
|-id=497 bgcolor=#d6d6d6
| 291497 ||  || — || February 25, 2006 || Kitt Peak || Spacewatch || EOS || align=right | 2.2 km || 
|-id=498 bgcolor=#d6d6d6
| 291498 ||  || — || February 25, 2006 || Kitt Peak || Spacewatch || HYG || align=right | 3.4 km || 
|-id=499 bgcolor=#E9E9E9
| 291499 ||  || — || February 25, 2006 || Mount Lemmon || Mount Lemmon Survey || — || align=right | 1.1 km || 
|-id=500 bgcolor=#fefefe
| 291500 ||  || — || February 25, 2006 || Kitt Peak || Spacewatch || NYS || align=right data-sort-value="0.70" | 700 m || 
|}

291501–291600 

|-bgcolor=#fefefe
| 291501 ||  || — || February 25, 2006 || Kitt Peak || Spacewatch || V || align=right data-sort-value="0.91" | 910 m || 
|-id=502 bgcolor=#E9E9E9
| 291502 ||  || — || February 25, 2006 || Kitt Peak || Spacewatch || — || align=right | 1.0 km || 
|-id=503 bgcolor=#d6d6d6
| 291503 ||  || — || February 26, 2006 || Kitt Peak || Spacewatch || — || align=right | 2.5 km || 
|-id=504 bgcolor=#fefefe
| 291504 ||  || — || February 27, 2006 || Kitt Peak || Spacewatch || MAS || align=right | 1.1 km || 
|-id=505 bgcolor=#d6d6d6
| 291505 ||  || — || February 27, 2006 || Kitt Peak || Spacewatch || THM || align=right | 2.6 km || 
|-id=506 bgcolor=#fefefe
| 291506 ||  || — || February 27, 2006 || Kitt Peak || Spacewatch || MAS || align=right data-sort-value="0.86" | 860 m || 
|-id=507 bgcolor=#fefefe
| 291507 ||  || — || February 27, 2006 || Mount Lemmon || Mount Lemmon Survey || NYS || align=right data-sort-value="0.80" | 800 m || 
|-id=508 bgcolor=#d6d6d6
| 291508 ||  || — || February 27, 2006 || Kitt Peak || Spacewatch || 627 || align=right | 3.5 km || 
|-id=509 bgcolor=#E9E9E9
| 291509 ||  || — || February 27, 2006 || Kitt Peak || Spacewatch || — || align=right | 1.0 km || 
|-id=510 bgcolor=#E9E9E9
| 291510 ||  || — || February 27, 2006 || Kitt Peak || Spacewatch || — || align=right | 1.7 km || 
|-id=511 bgcolor=#d6d6d6
| 291511 ||  || — || February 20, 2006 || Catalina || CSS || LUT || align=right | 10 km || 
|-id=512 bgcolor=#fefefe
| 291512 ||  || — || February 27, 2006 || Mount Lemmon || Mount Lemmon Survey || NYS || align=right data-sort-value="0.79" | 790 m || 
|-id=513 bgcolor=#E9E9E9
| 291513 ||  || — || February 25, 2006 || Anderson Mesa || LONEOS || JUN || align=right | 1.6 km || 
|-id=514 bgcolor=#fefefe
| 291514 ||  || — || February 25, 2006 || Kitt Peak || Spacewatch || — || align=right | 1.2 km || 
|-id=515 bgcolor=#fefefe
| 291515 ||  || — || February 28, 2006 || Mount Lemmon || Mount Lemmon Survey || — || align=right data-sort-value="0.93" | 930 m || 
|-id=516 bgcolor=#d6d6d6
| 291516 ||  || — || February 28, 2006 || Mount Lemmon || Mount Lemmon Survey || — || align=right | 3.4 km || 
|-id=517 bgcolor=#fefefe
| 291517 ||  || — || February 24, 2006 || Kitt Peak || Spacewatch || — || align=right | 1.1 km || 
|-id=518 bgcolor=#fefefe
| 291518 ||  || — || February 24, 2006 || Palomar || NEAT || — || align=right | 1.2 km || 
|-id=519 bgcolor=#C2FFFF
| 291519 ||  || — || February 24, 2006 || Mount Lemmon || Mount Lemmon Survey || L5 || align=right | 11 km || 
|-id=520 bgcolor=#fefefe
| 291520 ||  || — || March 4, 2006 || Catalina || CSS || H || align=right data-sort-value="0.68" | 680 m || 
|-id=521 bgcolor=#E9E9E9
| 291521 ||  || — || March 3, 2006 || Nyukasa || Mount Nyukasa Stn. || — || align=right | 2.0 km || 
|-id=522 bgcolor=#d6d6d6
| 291522 ||  || — || March 2, 2006 || Kitt Peak || Spacewatch || — || align=right | 3.3 km || 
|-id=523 bgcolor=#E9E9E9
| 291523 ||  || — || March 2, 2006 || Kitt Peak || Spacewatch || — || align=right | 1.5 km || 
|-id=524 bgcolor=#E9E9E9
| 291524 ||  || — || March 2, 2006 || Kitt Peak || Spacewatch || — || align=right | 2.2 km || 
|-id=525 bgcolor=#E9E9E9
| 291525 ||  || — || March 2, 2006 || Kitt Peak || Spacewatch || RAF || align=right | 2.4 km || 
|-id=526 bgcolor=#fefefe
| 291526 ||  || — || March 2, 2006 || Kitt Peak || Spacewatch || — || align=right | 1.1 km || 
|-id=527 bgcolor=#E9E9E9
| 291527 ||  || — || February 20, 2006 || Kitt Peak || Spacewatch || EUN || align=right | 1.1 km || 
|-id=528 bgcolor=#E9E9E9
| 291528 ||  || — || March 2, 2006 || Kitt Peak || Spacewatch || HEN || align=right | 1.3 km || 
|-id=529 bgcolor=#E9E9E9
| 291529 ||  || — || March 2, 2006 || Kitt Peak || Spacewatch || — || align=right | 1.6 km || 
|-id=530 bgcolor=#fefefe
| 291530 ||  || — || March 2, 2006 || Kitt Peak || Spacewatch || — || align=right data-sort-value="0.75" | 750 m || 
|-id=531 bgcolor=#E9E9E9
| 291531 ||  || — || March 3, 2006 || Kitt Peak || Spacewatch || — || align=right | 2.0 km || 
|-id=532 bgcolor=#fefefe
| 291532 ||  || — || March 3, 2006 || Kitt Peak || Spacewatch || — || align=right data-sort-value="0.71" | 710 m || 
|-id=533 bgcolor=#fefefe
| 291533 ||  || — || March 3, 2006 || Mount Lemmon || Mount Lemmon Survey || NYS || align=right data-sort-value="0.73" | 730 m || 
|-id=534 bgcolor=#d6d6d6
| 291534 ||  || — || March 3, 2006 || Kitt Peak || Spacewatch || — || align=right | 4.1 km || 
|-id=535 bgcolor=#E9E9E9
| 291535 ||  || — || March 3, 2006 || Mount Lemmon || Mount Lemmon Survey || HOF || align=right | 3.1 km || 
|-id=536 bgcolor=#E9E9E9
| 291536 ||  || — || March 4, 2006 || Kitt Peak || Spacewatch || — || align=right | 1.3 km || 
|-id=537 bgcolor=#d6d6d6
| 291537 ||  || — || March 4, 2006 || Kitt Peak || Spacewatch || — || align=right | 2.4 km || 
|-id=538 bgcolor=#fefefe
| 291538 ||  || — || March 4, 2006 || Kitt Peak || Spacewatch || — || align=right data-sort-value="0.76" | 760 m || 
|-id=539 bgcolor=#E9E9E9
| 291539 ||  || — || March 4, 2006 || Catalina || CSS || — || align=right | 2.8 km || 
|-id=540 bgcolor=#E9E9E9
| 291540 ||  || — || March 4, 2006 || Kitt Peak || Spacewatch || HOF || align=right | 4.2 km || 
|-id=541 bgcolor=#fefefe
| 291541 ||  || — || March 5, 2006 || Mount Lemmon || Mount Lemmon Survey || MAS || align=right | 1.1 km || 
|-id=542 bgcolor=#FA8072
| 291542 ||  || — || March 4, 2006 || Kitt Peak || Spacewatch || — || align=right | 1.2 km || 
|-id=543 bgcolor=#d6d6d6
| 291543 ||  || — || March 4, 2006 || Kitt Peak || Spacewatch || — || align=right | 3.1 km || 
|-id=544 bgcolor=#fefefe
| 291544 ||  || — || March 4, 2006 || Kitt Peak || Spacewatch || V || align=right data-sort-value="0.78" | 780 m || 
|-id=545 bgcolor=#E9E9E9
| 291545 ||  || — || March 4, 2006 || Kitt Peak || Spacewatch || — || align=right | 1.5 km || 
|-id=546 bgcolor=#d6d6d6
| 291546 ||  || — || March 5, 2006 || Kitt Peak || Spacewatch || — || align=right | 3.1 km || 
|-id=547 bgcolor=#E9E9E9
| 291547 ||  || — || March 5, 2006 || Kitt Peak || Spacewatch || — || align=right | 3.2 km || 
|-id=548 bgcolor=#fefefe
| 291548 ||  || — || March 5, 2006 || Kitt Peak || Spacewatch || NYS || align=right data-sort-value="0.83" | 830 m || 
|-id=549 bgcolor=#d6d6d6
| 291549 ||  || — || March 5, 2006 || Kitt Peak || Spacewatch || YAK || align=right | 3.0 km || 
|-id=550 bgcolor=#E9E9E9
| 291550 ||  || — || March 5, 2006 || Kitt Peak || Spacewatch || — || align=right | 2.9 km || 
|-id=551 bgcolor=#fefefe
| 291551 ||  || — || March 5, 2006 || Kitt Peak || Spacewatch || FLO || align=right data-sort-value="0.67" | 670 m || 
|-id=552 bgcolor=#E9E9E9
| 291552 ||  || — || March 5, 2006 || Kitt Peak || Spacewatch || — || align=right | 1.1 km || 
|-id=553 bgcolor=#fefefe
| 291553 ||  || — || March 2, 2006 || Mount Lemmon || Mount Lemmon Survey || — || align=right | 1.1 km || 
|-id=554 bgcolor=#d6d6d6
| 291554 ||  || — || March 4, 2006 || Kitt Peak || Spacewatch || — || align=right | 2.4 km || 
|-id=555 bgcolor=#E9E9E9
| 291555 ||  || — || March 4, 2006 || Mount Lemmon || Mount Lemmon Survey || — || align=right | 1.4 km || 
|-id=556 bgcolor=#fefefe
| 291556 ||  || — || March 22, 2006 || Catalina || CSS || FLO || align=right data-sort-value="0.90" | 900 m || 
|-id=557 bgcolor=#C2FFFF
| 291557 ||  || — || March 23, 2006 || Mount Lemmon || Mount Lemmon Survey || L5 || align=right | 13 km || 
|-id=558 bgcolor=#E9E9E9
| 291558 ||  || — || March 23, 2006 || Kitt Peak || Spacewatch || — || align=right data-sort-value="0.98" | 980 m || 
|-id=559 bgcolor=#fefefe
| 291559 ||  || — || March 23, 2006 || Kitt Peak || Spacewatch || NYS || align=right data-sort-value="0.83" | 830 m || 
|-id=560 bgcolor=#d6d6d6
| 291560 ||  || — || March 23, 2006 || Kitt Peak || Spacewatch || — || align=right | 2.9 km || 
|-id=561 bgcolor=#fefefe
| 291561 ||  || — || March 21, 2006 || Mount Lemmon || Mount Lemmon Survey || NYS || align=right data-sort-value="0.68" | 680 m || 
|-id=562 bgcolor=#fefefe
| 291562 ||  || — || March 23, 2006 || Mount Lemmon || Mount Lemmon Survey || V || align=right data-sort-value="0.81" | 810 m || 
|-id=563 bgcolor=#E9E9E9
| 291563 ||  || — || March 24, 2006 || Mount Lemmon || Mount Lemmon Survey || — || align=right | 1.4 km || 
|-id=564 bgcolor=#d6d6d6
| 291564 ||  || — || March 24, 2006 || Mount Lemmon || Mount Lemmon Survey || — || align=right | 2.9 km || 
|-id=565 bgcolor=#d6d6d6
| 291565 ||  || — || March 24, 2006 || Mount Lemmon || Mount Lemmon Survey || THM || align=right | 2.3 km || 
|-id=566 bgcolor=#fefefe
| 291566 ||  || — || March 24, 2006 || Mount Lemmon || Mount Lemmon Survey || V || align=right data-sort-value="0.94" | 940 m || 
|-id=567 bgcolor=#d6d6d6
| 291567 ||  || — || March 25, 2006 || Kitt Peak || Spacewatch || — || align=right | 3.8 km || 
|-id=568 bgcolor=#fefefe
| 291568 ||  || — || March 25, 2006 || Kitt Peak || Spacewatch || — || align=right data-sort-value="0.85" | 850 m || 
|-id=569 bgcolor=#E9E9E9
| 291569 ||  || — || March 25, 2006 || Kitt Peak || Spacewatch || — || align=right data-sort-value="0.90" | 900 m || 
|-id=570 bgcolor=#d6d6d6
| 291570 ||  || — || March 25, 2006 || Mount Lemmon || Mount Lemmon Survey || — || align=right | 4.5 km || 
|-id=571 bgcolor=#E9E9E9
| 291571 ||  || — || March 25, 2006 || Kitt Peak || Spacewatch || — || align=right | 1.3 km || 
|-id=572 bgcolor=#d6d6d6
| 291572 ||  || — || March 24, 2006 || Socorro || LINEAR || — || align=right | 3.7 km || 
|-id=573 bgcolor=#fefefe
| 291573 ||  || — || March 24, 2006 || Kitt Peak || Spacewatch || — || align=right | 1.0 km || 
|-id=574 bgcolor=#fefefe
| 291574 ||  || — || March 23, 2006 || Catalina || CSS || — || align=right | 3.6 km || 
|-id=575 bgcolor=#d6d6d6
| 291575 ||  || — || March 24, 2006 || Kitt Peak || Spacewatch || — || align=right | 3.9 km || 
|-id=576 bgcolor=#E9E9E9
| 291576 ||  || — || March 26, 2006 || Mount Lemmon || Mount Lemmon Survey || — || align=right data-sort-value="0.86" | 860 m || 
|-id=577 bgcolor=#E9E9E9
| 291577 ||  || — || March 26, 2006 || Mount Lemmon || Mount Lemmon Survey || — || align=right | 1.4 km || 
|-id=578 bgcolor=#fefefe
| 291578 ||  || — || March 26, 2006 || Mount Lemmon || Mount Lemmon Survey || — || align=right data-sort-value="0.96" | 960 m || 
|-id=579 bgcolor=#E9E9E9
| 291579 ||  || — || March 23, 2006 || Catalina || CSS || EUN || align=right | 1.5 km || 
|-id=580 bgcolor=#fefefe
| 291580 ||  || — || March 29, 2006 || Črni Vrh || Črni Vrh || — || align=right | 1.2 km || 
|-id=581 bgcolor=#fefefe
| 291581 ||  || — || March 26, 2006 || Mount Lemmon || Mount Lemmon Survey || — || align=right data-sort-value="0.59" | 590 m || 
|-id=582 bgcolor=#fefefe
| 291582 ||  || — || March 26, 2006 || Kitt Peak || Spacewatch || NYS || align=right data-sort-value="0.82" | 820 m || 
|-id=583 bgcolor=#d6d6d6
| 291583 ||  || — || April 2, 2006 || Mount Lemmon || Mount Lemmon Survey || — || align=right | 4.2 km || 
|-id=584 bgcolor=#fefefe
| 291584 ||  || — || April 2, 2006 || Kitt Peak || Spacewatch || — || align=right data-sort-value="0.54" | 540 m || 
|-id=585 bgcolor=#E9E9E9
| 291585 ||  || — || April 2, 2006 || Kitt Peak || Spacewatch || — || align=right | 2.4 km || 
|-id=586 bgcolor=#fefefe
| 291586 ||  || — || April 2, 2006 || Kitt Peak || Spacewatch || — || align=right data-sort-value="0.88" | 880 m || 
|-id=587 bgcolor=#fefefe
| 291587 ||  || — || April 2, 2006 || Kitt Peak || Spacewatch || — || align=right | 1.8 km || 
|-id=588 bgcolor=#E9E9E9
| 291588 ||  || — || April 2, 2006 || Kitt Peak || Spacewatch || — || align=right | 1.8 km || 
|-id=589 bgcolor=#fefefe
| 291589 ||  || — || April 2, 2006 || Kitt Peak || Spacewatch || — || align=right | 1.2 km || 
|-id=590 bgcolor=#E9E9E9
| 291590 ||  || — || April 2, 2006 || Kitt Peak || Spacewatch || — || align=right | 2.0 km || 
|-id=591 bgcolor=#E9E9E9
| 291591 ||  || — || April 2, 2006 || Kitt Peak || Spacewatch || — || align=right data-sort-value="0.91" | 910 m || 
|-id=592 bgcolor=#E9E9E9
| 291592 ||  || — || April 2, 2006 || Kitt Peak || Spacewatch || MAR || align=right | 1.6 km || 
|-id=593 bgcolor=#d6d6d6
| 291593 ||  || — || April 2, 2006 || Kitt Peak || Spacewatch || — || align=right | 3.1 km || 
|-id=594 bgcolor=#fefefe
| 291594 ||  || — || April 2, 2006 || Kitt Peak || Spacewatch || FLO || align=right data-sort-value="0.52" | 520 m || 
|-id=595 bgcolor=#d6d6d6
| 291595 ||  || — || April 2, 2006 || Kitt Peak || Spacewatch || EOS || align=right | 2.6 km || 
|-id=596 bgcolor=#fefefe
| 291596 ||  || — || April 2, 2006 || Kitt Peak || Spacewatch || — || align=right | 1.2 km || 
|-id=597 bgcolor=#fefefe
| 291597 ||  || — || April 2, 2006 || Kitt Peak || Spacewatch || MAS || align=right data-sort-value="0.93" | 930 m || 
|-id=598 bgcolor=#E9E9E9
| 291598 ||  || — || April 2, 2006 || Kitt Peak || Spacewatch || — || align=right data-sort-value="0.85" | 850 m || 
|-id=599 bgcolor=#E9E9E9
| 291599 ||  || — || April 2, 2006 || Mount Lemmon || Mount Lemmon Survey || BRG || align=right | 1.7 km || 
|-id=600 bgcolor=#fefefe
| 291600 ||  || — || April 2, 2006 || Mount Lemmon || Mount Lemmon Survey || NYS || align=right data-sort-value="0.66" | 660 m || 
|}

291601–291700 

|-bgcolor=#E9E9E9
| 291601 ||  || — || April 2, 2006 || Kitt Peak || Spacewatch || — || align=right | 1.4 km || 
|-id=602 bgcolor=#fefefe
| 291602 ||  || — || April 2, 2006 || Kitt Peak || Spacewatch || — || align=right data-sort-value="0.81" | 810 m || 
|-id=603 bgcolor=#d6d6d6
| 291603 ||  || — || April 7, 2006 || Kitt Peak || Spacewatch || — || align=right | 3.1 km || 
|-id=604 bgcolor=#E9E9E9
| 291604 ||  || — || April 7, 2006 || Catalina || CSS || — || align=right | 2.0 km || 
|-id=605 bgcolor=#E9E9E9
| 291605 ||  || — || April 7, 2006 || Catalina || CSS || EUN || align=right | 2.0 km || 
|-id=606 bgcolor=#E9E9E9
| 291606 ||  || — || April 7, 2006 || Anderson Mesa || LONEOS || — || align=right | 2.1 km || 
|-id=607 bgcolor=#d6d6d6
| 291607 ||  || — || April 2, 2006 || Anderson Mesa || LONEOS || THB || align=right | 6.2 km || 
|-id=608 bgcolor=#fefefe
| 291608 ||  || — || April 9, 2006 || Kitt Peak || Spacewatch || — || align=right data-sort-value="0.78" | 780 m || 
|-id=609 bgcolor=#E9E9E9
| 291609 ||  || — || April 13, 2006 || Palomar || NEAT || — || align=right | 1.6 km || 
|-id=610 bgcolor=#d6d6d6
| 291610 ||  || — || April 2, 2006 || Mount Lemmon || Mount Lemmon Survey || — || align=right | 3.6 km || 
|-id=611 bgcolor=#fefefe
| 291611 ||  || — || April 8, 2006 || Kitt Peak || Spacewatch || — || align=right | 1.1 km || 
|-id=612 bgcolor=#fefefe
| 291612 ||  || — || April 9, 2006 || Kitt Peak || Spacewatch || MAS || align=right data-sort-value="0.98" | 980 m || 
|-id=613 bgcolor=#fefefe
| 291613 ||  || — || April 9, 2006 || Kitt Peak || Spacewatch || FLO || align=right data-sort-value="0.83" | 830 m || 
|-id=614 bgcolor=#fefefe
| 291614 ||  || — || April 9, 2006 || Kitt Peak || Spacewatch || — || align=right data-sort-value="0.60" | 600 m || 
|-id=615 bgcolor=#E9E9E9
| 291615 ||  || — || April 2, 2006 || Kitt Peak || Spacewatch || — || align=right | 2.1 km || 
|-id=616 bgcolor=#d6d6d6
| 291616 ||  || — || April 18, 2006 || Anderson Mesa || LONEOS || EUP || align=right | 6.2 km || 
|-id=617 bgcolor=#d6d6d6
| 291617 ||  || — || April 18, 2006 || Anderson Mesa || LONEOS || — || align=right | 4.7 km || 
|-id=618 bgcolor=#fefefe
| 291618 ||  || — || April 18, 2006 || Palomar || NEAT || — || align=right | 1.3 km || 
|-id=619 bgcolor=#E9E9E9
| 291619 ||  || — || April 18, 2006 || Kitt Peak || Spacewatch || — || align=right | 1.0 km || 
|-id=620 bgcolor=#d6d6d6
| 291620 ||  || — || April 19, 2006 || Anderson Mesa || LONEOS || — || align=right | 3.8 km || 
|-id=621 bgcolor=#fefefe
| 291621 ||  || — || April 19, 2006 || Palomar || NEAT || V || align=right data-sort-value="0.93" | 930 m || 
|-id=622 bgcolor=#d6d6d6
| 291622 ||  || — || April 18, 2006 || Catalina || CSS || HIL3:2 || align=right | 9.1 km || 
|-id=623 bgcolor=#fefefe
| 291623 ||  || — || April 19, 2006 || Palomar || NEAT || — || align=right | 1.1 km || 
|-id=624 bgcolor=#d6d6d6
| 291624 ||  || — || April 19, 2006 || Anderson Mesa || LONEOS || — || align=right | 6.0 km || 
|-id=625 bgcolor=#fefefe
| 291625 ||  || — || April 19, 2006 || Kitt Peak || Spacewatch || — || align=right | 1.2 km || 
|-id=626 bgcolor=#E9E9E9
| 291626 ||  || — || April 19, 2006 || Kitt Peak || Spacewatch || — || align=right | 2.3 km || 
|-id=627 bgcolor=#d6d6d6
| 291627 ||  || — || April 19, 2006 || Kitt Peak || Spacewatch || — || align=right | 3.9 km || 
|-id=628 bgcolor=#fefefe
| 291628 ||  || — || April 19, 2006 || Kitt Peak || Spacewatch || V || align=right data-sort-value="0.86" | 860 m || 
|-id=629 bgcolor=#fefefe
| 291629 ||  || — || April 19, 2006 || Palomar || NEAT || — || align=right | 1.2 km || 
|-id=630 bgcolor=#E9E9E9
| 291630 ||  || — || April 19, 2006 || Mount Lemmon || Mount Lemmon Survey || KRM || align=right | 2.8 km || 
|-id=631 bgcolor=#fefefe
| 291631 ||  || — || April 19, 2006 || Palomar || NEAT || — || align=right data-sort-value="0.82" | 820 m || 
|-id=632 bgcolor=#fefefe
| 291632 ||  || — || April 20, 2006 || Kitt Peak || Spacewatch || — || align=right data-sort-value="0.87" | 870 m || 
|-id=633 bgcolor=#d6d6d6
| 291633 Heyun ||  ||  || April 19, 2006 || Lulin Observatory || Q.-z. Ye, H.-C. Lin || — || align=right | 3.2 km || 
|-id=634 bgcolor=#fefefe
| 291634 ||  || — || April 20, 2006 || Kitt Peak || Spacewatch || V || align=right data-sort-value="0.82" | 820 m || 
|-id=635 bgcolor=#E9E9E9
| 291635 ||  || — || April 20, 2006 || Kitt Peak || Spacewatch || — || align=right | 1.3 km || 
|-id=636 bgcolor=#fefefe
| 291636 ||  || — || April 20, 2006 || Kitt Peak || Spacewatch || NYS || align=right data-sort-value="0.77" | 770 m || 
|-id=637 bgcolor=#fefefe
| 291637 ||  || — || April 20, 2006 || Kitt Peak || Spacewatch || — || align=right | 2.6 km || 
|-id=638 bgcolor=#E9E9E9
| 291638 ||  || — || April 20, 2006 || Kitt Peak || Spacewatch || — || align=right | 2.0 km || 
|-id=639 bgcolor=#fefefe
| 291639 ||  || — || April 20, 2006 || Kitt Peak || Spacewatch || — || align=right data-sort-value="0.99" | 990 m || 
|-id=640 bgcolor=#E9E9E9
| 291640 ||  || — || April 21, 2006 || Kitt Peak || Spacewatch || — || align=right | 1.2 km || 
|-id=641 bgcolor=#fefefe
| 291641 ||  || — || April 18, 2006 || Palomar || NEAT || FLO || align=right data-sort-value="0.96" | 960 m || 
|-id=642 bgcolor=#fefefe
| 291642 ||  || — || April 21, 2006 || Kitt Peak || Spacewatch || — || align=right | 1.1 km || 
|-id=643 bgcolor=#fefefe
| 291643 ||  || — || April 21, 2006 || Kitt Peak || Spacewatch || FLO || align=right data-sort-value="0.78" | 780 m || 
|-id=644 bgcolor=#fefefe
| 291644 ||  || — || April 21, 2006 || Kitt Peak || Spacewatch || NYS || align=right data-sort-value="0.66" | 660 m || 
|-id=645 bgcolor=#E9E9E9
| 291645 ||  || — || April 21, 2006 || Kitt Peak || Spacewatch || — || align=right | 2.0 km || 
|-id=646 bgcolor=#E9E9E9
| 291646 ||  || — || April 24, 2006 || Kitt Peak || Spacewatch || HEN || align=right | 1.4 km || 
|-id=647 bgcolor=#d6d6d6
| 291647 ||  || — || April 25, 2006 || Kitt Peak || Spacewatch || THM || align=right | 2.3 km || 
|-id=648 bgcolor=#d6d6d6
| 291648 ||  || — || April 24, 2006 || Kitt Peak || Spacewatch || — || align=right | 3.4 km || 
|-id=649 bgcolor=#E9E9E9
| 291649 ||  || — || April 25, 2006 || Kitt Peak || Spacewatch || — || align=right | 2.1 km || 
|-id=650 bgcolor=#fefefe
| 291650 ||  || — || April 26, 2006 || Kitt Peak || Spacewatch || — || align=right | 1.0 km || 
|-id=651 bgcolor=#E9E9E9
| 291651 ||  || — || April 26, 2006 || Mount Lemmon || Mount Lemmon Survey || HEN || align=right | 1.2 km || 
|-id=652 bgcolor=#fefefe
| 291652 ||  || — || April 24, 2006 || Reedy Creek || J. Broughton || FLO || align=right data-sort-value="0.79" | 790 m || 
|-id=653 bgcolor=#E9E9E9
| 291653 ||  || — || April 18, 2006 || Anderson Mesa || LONEOS || — || align=right | 1.4 km || 
|-id=654 bgcolor=#fefefe
| 291654 ||  || — || April 19, 2006 || Palomar || NEAT || H || align=right data-sort-value="0.73" | 730 m || 
|-id=655 bgcolor=#d6d6d6
| 291655 ||  || — || April 21, 2006 || Catalina || CSS || — || align=right | 7.1 km || 
|-id=656 bgcolor=#fefefe
| 291656 ||  || — || April 23, 2006 || Anderson Mesa || LONEOS || — || align=right | 1.5 km || 
|-id=657 bgcolor=#fefefe
| 291657 ||  || — || April 26, 2006 || Kitt Peak || Spacewatch || FLO || align=right data-sort-value="0.76" | 760 m || 
|-id=658 bgcolor=#E9E9E9
| 291658 ||  || — || April 24, 2006 || Kitt Peak || Spacewatch || — || align=right | 2.1 km || 
|-id=659 bgcolor=#E9E9E9
| 291659 ||  || — || April 24, 2006 || Kitt Peak || Spacewatch || — || align=right data-sort-value="0.96" | 960 m || 
|-id=660 bgcolor=#E9E9E9
| 291660 ||  || — || April 24, 2006 || Kitt Peak || Spacewatch || — || align=right | 2.5 km || 
|-id=661 bgcolor=#fefefe
| 291661 ||  || — || April 24, 2006 || Kitt Peak || Spacewatch || MAS || align=right data-sort-value="0.75" | 750 m || 
|-id=662 bgcolor=#E9E9E9
| 291662 ||  || — || April 24, 2006 || Kitt Peak || Spacewatch || — || align=right | 3.0 km || 
|-id=663 bgcolor=#fefefe
| 291663 ||  || — || April 24, 2006 || Kitt Peak || Spacewatch || NYS || align=right data-sort-value="0.76" | 760 m || 
|-id=664 bgcolor=#E9E9E9
| 291664 ||  || — || April 24, 2006 || Mount Lemmon || Mount Lemmon Survey || — || align=right | 3.3 km || 
|-id=665 bgcolor=#d6d6d6
| 291665 ||  || — || April 24, 2006 || Mount Lemmon || Mount Lemmon Survey || — || align=right | 3.9 km || 
|-id=666 bgcolor=#fefefe
| 291666 ||  || — || April 24, 2006 || Anderson Mesa || LONEOS || ERI || align=right | 1.9 km || 
|-id=667 bgcolor=#d6d6d6
| 291667 ||  || — || April 24, 2006 || Kitt Peak || Spacewatch || — || align=right | 5.2 km || 
|-id=668 bgcolor=#d6d6d6
| 291668 ||  || — || April 25, 2006 || Kitt Peak || Spacewatch || — || align=right | 4.5 km || 
|-id=669 bgcolor=#fefefe
| 291669 ||  || — || April 25, 2006 || Kitt Peak || Spacewatch || V || align=right data-sort-value="0.96" | 960 m || 
|-id=670 bgcolor=#E9E9E9
| 291670 ||  || — || April 25, 2006 || Kitt Peak || Spacewatch || RAF || align=right | 1.6 km || 
|-id=671 bgcolor=#fefefe
| 291671 ||  || — || April 26, 2006 || Kitt Peak || Spacewatch || — || align=right | 1.3 km || 
|-id=672 bgcolor=#fefefe
| 291672 ||  || — || April 26, 2006 || Kitt Peak || Spacewatch || V || align=right | 1.1 km || 
|-id=673 bgcolor=#E9E9E9
| 291673 ||  || — || April 26, 2006 || Kitt Peak || Spacewatch || — || align=right | 1.6 km || 
|-id=674 bgcolor=#E9E9E9
| 291674 ||  || — || April 26, 2006 || Kitt Peak || Spacewatch || — || align=right | 1.2 km || 
|-id=675 bgcolor=#E9E9E9
| 291675 ||  || — || April 26, 2006 || Kitt Peak || Spacewatch || — || align=right | 1.8 km || 
|-id=676 bgcolor=#d6d6d6
| 291676 ||  || — || April 26, 2006 || Kitt Peak || Spacewatch || HIL3:2 || align=right | 7.0 km || 
|-id=677 bgcolor=#fefefe
| 291677 ||  || — || April 26, 2006 || Kitt Peak || Spacewatch || — || align=right data-sort-value="0.87" | 870 m || 
|-id=678 bgcolor=#E9E9E9
| 291678 ||  || — || April 26, 2006 || Kitt Peak || Spacewatch || GEF || align=right | 1.6 km || 
|-id=679 bgcolor=#d6d6d6
| 291679 ||  || — || April 19, 2006 || Catalina || CSS || — || align=right | 5.2 km || 
|-id=680 bgcolor=#fefefe
| 291680 ||  || — || April 29, 2006 || Kitt Peak || Spacewatch || FLO || align=right data-sort-value="0.72" | 720 m || 
|-id=681 bgcolor=#fefefe
| 291681 ||  || — || April 29, 2006 || Kitt Peak || Spacewatch || — || align=right data-sort-value="0.97" | 970 m || 
|-id=682 bgcolor=#E9E9E9
| 291682 ||  || — || April 30, 2006 || Kitt Peak || Spacewatch || AST || align=right | 2.8 km || 
|-id=683 bgcolor=#fefefe
| 291683 ||  || — || April 30, 2006 || Kitt Peak || Spacewatch || NYS || align=right data-sort-value="0.96" | 960 m || 
|-id=684 bgcolor=#d6d6d6
| 291684 ||  || — || April 30, 2006 || Kitt Peak || Spacewatch || KOR || align=right | 1.4 km || 
|-id=685 bgcolor=#E9E9E9
| 291685 ||  || — || April 30, 2006 || Kitt Peak || Spacewatch || HOF || align=right | 2.8 km || 
|-id=686 bgcolor=#E9E9E9
| 291686 ||  || — || April 30, 2006 || Kitt Peak || Spacewatch || HEN || align=right | 1.1 km || 
|-id=687 bgcolor=#E9E9E9
| 291687 ||  || — || April 30, 2006 || Kitt Peak || Spacewatch || HOF || align=right | 3.6 km || 
|-id=688 bgcolor=#fefefe
| 291688 ||  || — || April 30, 2006 || Kitt Peak || Spacewatch || NYS || align=right data-sort-value="0.62" | 620 m || 
|-id=689 bgcolor=#fefefe
| 291689 ||  || — || April 30, 2006 || Kitt Peak || Spacewatch || NYS || align=right data-sort-value="0.73" | 730 m || 
|-id=690 bgcolor=#E9E9E9
| 291690 ||  || — || April 30, 2006 || Kitt Peak || Spacewatch || IAN || align=right | 1.2 km || 
|-id=691 bgcolor=#fefefe
| 291691 ||  || — || April 28, 2006 || Socorro || LINEAR || — || align=right data-sort-value="0.91" | 910 m || 
|-id=692 bgcolor=#E9E9E9
| 291692 ||  || — || April 30, 2006 || Kitt Peak || Spacewatch || — || align=right | 2.1 km || 
|-id=693 bgcolor=#E9E9E9
| 291693 ||  || — || April 30, 2006 || Kitt Peak || Spacewatch || AGN || align=right | 1.3 km || 
|-id=694 bgcolor=#fefefe
| 291694 ||  || — || April 24, 2006 || Siding Spring || SSS || PHO || align=right | 1.7 km || 
|-id=695 bgcolor=#E9E9E9
| 291695 ||  || — || April 26, 2006 || Siding Spring || SSS || — || align=right | 3.3 km || 
|-id=696 bgcolor=#E9E9E9
| 291696 ||  || — || April 26, 2006 || Kitt Peak || Spacewatch || AGN || align=right | 1.3 km || 
|-id=697 bgcolor=#E9E9E9
| 291697 ||  || — || April 26, 2006 || Kitt Peak || Spacewatch || AST || align=right | 1.6 km || 
|-id=698 bgcolor=#fefefe
| 291698 ||  || — || April 26, 2006 || Kitt Peak || Spacewatch || MAS || align=right data-sort-value="0.77" | 770 m || 
|-id=699 bgcolor=#fefefe
| 291699 ||  || — || April 29, 2006 || Kitt Peak || Spacewatch || SUL || align=right | 2.9 km || 
|-id=700 bgcolor=#fefefe
| 291700 ||  || — || April 26, 2006 || Kitt Peak || Spacewatch || — || align=right data-sort-value="0.67" | 670 m || 
|}

291701–291800 

|-bgcolor=#fefefe
| 291701 ||  || — || April 19, 2006 || Mount Lemmon || Mount Lemmon Survey || — || align=right | 1.0 km || 
|-id=702 bgcolor=#E9E9E9
| 291702 ||  || — || May 1, 2006 || Kitt Peak || Spacewatch || — || align=right | 2.4 km || 
|-id=703 bgcolor=#E9E9E9
| 291703 ||  || — || May 2, 2006 || Mount Lemmon || Mount Lemmon Survey || — || align=right | 3.1 km || 
|-id=704 bgcolor=#E9E9E9
| 291704 ||  || — || May 2, 2006 || Nyukasa || Mount Nyukasa Stn. || — || align=right | 1.8 km || 
|-id=705 bgcolor=#E9E9E9
| 291705 ||  || — || May 1, 2006 || Kitt Peak || Spacewatch || MAR || align=right | 1.3 km || 
|-id=706 bgcolor=#E9E9E9
| 291706 ||  || — || May 1, 2006 || Kitt Peak || Spacewatch || — || align=right | 3.2 km || 
|-id=707 bgcolor=#d6d6d6
| 291707 ||  || — || May 1, 2006 || Socorro || LINEAR || — || align=right | 4.7 km || 
|-id=708 bgcolor=#fefefe
| 291708 ||  || — || May 1, 2006 || Kitt Peak || Spacewatch || V || align=right data-sort-value="0.89" | 890 m || 
|-id=709 bgcolor=#E9E9E9
| 291709 ||  || — || May 1, 2006 || Kitt Peak || Spacewatch || MRX || align=right | 1.1 km || 
|-id=710 bgcolor=#E9E9E9
| 291710 ||  || — || May 2, 2006 || Mount Lemmon || Mount Lemmon Survey || — || align=right | 2.1 km || 
|-id=711 bgcolor=#fefefe
| 291711 ||  || — || May 2, 2006 || Kitt Peak || Spacewatch || — || align=right data-sort-value="0.85" | 850 m || 
|-id=712 bgcolor=#fefefe
| 291712 ||  || — || May 2, 2006 || Mount Lemmon || Mount Lemmon Survey || ERI || align=right | 1.7 km || 
|-id=713 bgcolor=#E9E9E9
| 291713 ||  || — || May 2, 2006 || Mount Lemmon || Mount Lemmon Survey || JUN || align=right | 1.2 km || 
|-id=714 bgcolor=#d6d6d6
| 291714 ||  || — || May 2, 2006 || Kitt Peak || Spacewatch || — || align=right | 5.4 km || 
|-id=715 bgcolor=#fefefe
| 291715 ||  || — || May 3, 2006 || Mount Lemmon || Mount Lemmon Survey || — || align=right | 1.3 km || 
|-id=716 bgcolor=#E9E9E9
| 291716 ||  || — || May 3, 2006 || Mount Lemmon || Mount Lemmon Survey || — || align=right | 1.6 km || 
|-id=717 bgcolor=#E9E9E9
| 291717 ||  || — || May 3, 2006 || Mount Lemmon || Mount Lemmon Survey || — || align=right data-sort-value="0.89" | 890 m || 
|-id=718 bgcolor=#E9E9E9
| 291718 ||  || — || May 4, 2006 || Reedy Creek || J. Broughton || — || align=right | 2.2 km || 
|-id=719 bgcolor=#E9E9E9
| 291719 ||  || — || May 1, 2006 || Kitt Peak || Spacewatch || — || align=right | 1.4 km || 
|-id=720 bgcolor=#fefefe
| 291720 ||  || — || May 3, 2006 || Kitt Peak || Spacewatch || — || align=right data-sort-value="0.81" | 810 m || 
|-id=721 bgcolor=#fefefe
| 291721 ||  || — || May 3, 2006 || Kitt Peak || Spacewatch || — || align=right data-sort-value="0.92" | 920 m || 
|-id=722 bgcolor=#E9E9E9
| 291722 ||  || — || May 3, 2006 || Kitt Peak || Spacewatch || HOF || align=right | 3.1 km || 
|-id=723 bgcolor=#E9E9E9
| 291723 ||  || — || May 3, 2006 || Kitt Peak || Spacewatch || — || align=right | 1.5 km || 
|-id=724 bgcolor=#E9E9E9
| 291724 ||  || — || May 4, 2006 || Kitt Peak || Spacewatch || — || align=right | 1.5 km || 
|-id=725 bgcolor=#fefefe
| 291725 ||  || — || May 4, 2006 || Kitt Peak || Spacewatch || FLO || align=right data-sort-value="0.84" | 840 m || 
|-id=726 bgcolor=#E9E9E9
| 291726 ||  || — || May 4, 2006 || Kitt Peak || Spacewatch || — || align=right | 1.1 km || 
|-id=727 bgcolor=#fefefe
| 291727 ||  || — || May 5, 2006 || Anderson Mesa || LONEOS || — || align=right data-sort-value="0.82" | 820 m || 
|-id=728 bgcolor=#E9E9E9
| 291728 ||  || — || May 6, 2006 || Kitt Peak || Spacewatch || — || align=right | 1.9 km || 
|-id=729 bgcolor=#fefefe
| 291729 ||  || — || May 7, 2006 || Kitt Peak || Spacewatch || — || align=right | 1.4 km || 
|-id=730 bgcolor=#d6d6d6
| 291730 ||  || — || May 7, 2006 || Kitt Peak || Spacewatch || — || align=right | 2.6 km || 
|-id=731 bgcolor=#d6d6d6
| 291731 ||  || — || May 7, 2006 || Kitt Peak || Spacewatch || — || align=right | 3.2 km || 
|-id=732 bgcolor=#fefefe
| 291732 ||  || — || May 2, 2006 || Mount Lemmon || Mount Lemmon Survey || MAS || align=right data-sort-value="0.65" | 650 m || 
|-id=733 bgcolor=#fefefe
| 291733 ||  || — || May 7, 2006 || Mount Lemmon || Mount Lemmon Survey || NYS || align=right data-sort-value="0.64" | 640 m || 
|-id=734 bgcolor=#E9E9E9
| 291734 ||  || — || May 1, 2006 || Socorro || LINEAR || — || align=right | 1.6 km || 
|-id=735 bgcolor=#E9E9E9
| 291735 ||  || — || May 5, 2006 || Kitt Peak || Spacewatch || MAR || align=right | 1.6 km || 
|-id=736 bgcolor=#E9E9E9
| 291736 ||  || — || May 1, 2006 || Socorro || LINEAR || JUN || align=right | 1.6 km || 
|-id=737 bgcolor=#fefefe
| 291737 ||  || — || May 1, 2006 || Socorro || LINEAR || — || align=right | 2.0 km || 
|-id=738 bgcolor=#d6d6d6
| 291738 ||  || — || May 2, 2006 || Mount Lemmon || Mount Lemmon Survey || THM || align=right | 2.8 km || 
|-id=739 bgcolor=#fefefe
| 291739 ||  || — || May 2, 2006 || Mount Lemmon || Mount Lemmon Survey || NYS || align=right data-sort-value="0.92" | 920 m || 
|-id=740 bgcolor=#E9E9E9
| 291740 ||  || — || May 6, 2006 || Kitt Peak || Spacewatch || — || align=right | 1.7 km || 
|-id=741 bgcolor=#fefefe
| 291741 ||  || — || May 9, 2006 || Mount Lemmon || Mount Lemmon Survey || — || align=right data-sort-value="0.71" | 710 m || 
|-id=742 bgcolor=#fefefe
| 291742 ||  || — || May 5, 2006 || Anderson Mesa || LONEOS || FLO || align=right data-sort-value="0.86" | 860 m || 
|-id=743 bgcolor=#fefefe
| 291743 ||  || — || May 1, 2006 || Kitt Peak || M. W. Buie || — || align=right | 1.9 km || 
|-id=744 bgcolor=#E9E9E9
| 291744 ||  || — || May 2, 2006 || Mount Lemmon || Mount Lemmon Survey || PAD || align=right | 1.9 km || 
|-id=745 bgcolor=#E9E9E9
| 291745 ||  || — || May 18, 2006 || Palomar || NEAT || — || align=right | 1.8 km || 
|-id=746 bgcolor=#d6d6d6
| 291746 ||  || — || May 16, 2006 || Palomar || NEAT || — || align=right | 3.5 km || 
|-id=747 bgcolor=#E9E9E9
| 291747 ||  || — || May 18, 2006 || Palomar || NEAT || — || align=right | 1.4 km || 
|-id=748 bgcolor=#d6d6d6
| 291748 ||  || — || May 19, 2006 || Mount Lemmon || Mount Lemmon Survey || — || align=right | 3.7 km || 
|-id=749 bgcolor=#E9E9E9
| 291749 ||  || — || May 19, 2006 || Mount Lemmon || Mount Lemmon Survey || — || align=right | 1.0 km || 
|-id=750 bgcolor=#d6d6d6
| 291750 ||  || — || May 19, 2006 || Anderson Mesa || LONEOS || — || align=right | 4.9 km || 
|-id=751 bgcolor=#E9E9E9
| 291751 ||  || — || May 19, 2006 || Mount Lemmon || Mount Lemmon Survey || — || align=right | 1.7 km || 
|-id=752 bgcolor=#E9E9E9
| 291752 ||  || — || May 19, 2006 || Mount Lemmon || Mount Lemmon Survey || — || align=right | 2.0 km || 
|-id=753 bgcolor=#d6d6d6
| 291753 ||  || — || May 19, 2006 || Mount Lemmon || Mount Lemmon Survey || 3:2 || align=right | 5.1 km || 
|-id=754 bgcolor=#E9E9E9
| 291754 ||  || — || May 19, 2006 || Mount Lemmon || Mount Lemmon Survey || HOF || align=right | 2.6 km || 
|-id=755 bgcolor=#E9E9E9
| 291755 ||  || — || May 19, 2006 || Mount Lemmon || Mount Lemmon Survey || — || align=right | 2.6 km || 
|-id=756 bgcolor=#fefefe
| 291756 ||  || — || May 19, 2006 || Catalina || CSS || — || align=right data-sort-value="0.98" | 980 m || 
|-id=757 bgcolor=#E9E9E9
| 291757 ||  || — || May 19, 2006 || Mount Lemmon || Mount Lemmon Survey || — || align=right | 2.1 km || 
|-id=758 bgcolor=#E9E9E9
| 291758 ||  || — || May 20, 2006 || Kitt Peak || Spacewatch || — || align=right | 2.8 km || 
|-id=759 bgcolor=#E9E9E9
| 291759 ||  || — || May 20, 2006 || Catalina || CSS || — || align=right | 3.4 km || 
|-id=760 bgcolor=#E9E9E9
| 291760 ||  || — || May 20, 2006 || Palomar || NEAT || KRM || align=right | 3.0 km || 
|-id=761 bgcolor=#fefefe
| 291761 ||  || — || May 20, 2006 || Palomar || NEAT || V || align=right data-sort-value="0.83" | 830 m || 
|-id=762 bgcolor=#fefefe
| 291762 ||  || — || May 21, 2006 || Mount Lemmon || Mount Lemmon Survey || — || align=right data-sort-value="0.99" | 990 m || 
|-id=763 bgcolor=#d6d6d6
| 291763 ||  || — || May 21, 2006 || Kitt Peak || Spacewatch || — || align=right | 3.0 km || 
|-id=764 bgcolor=#d6d6d6
| 291764 ||  || — || May 21, 2006 || Kitt Peak || Spacewatch || — || align=right | 5.1 km || 
|-id=765 bgcolor=#fefefe
| 291765 ||  || — || May 21, 2006 || Catalina || CSS || — || align=right | 1.2 km || 
|-id=766 bgcolor=#E9E9E9
| 291766 ||  || — || May 21, 2006 || Palomar || NEAT || — || align=right | 1.4 km || 
|-id=767 bgcolor=#fefefe
| 291767 ||  || — || May 16, 2006 || Palomar || NEAT || NYS || align=right data-sort-value="0.92" | 920 m || 
|-id=768 bgcolor=#E9E9E9
| 291768 ||  || — || May 20, 2006 || Catalina || CSS || — || align=right | 1.2 km || 
|-id=769 bgcolor=#fefefe
| 291769 ||  || — || May 19, 2006 || Mount Lemmon || Mount Lemmon Survey || — || align=right data-sort-value="0.84" | 840 m || 
|-id=770 bgcolor=#E9E9E9
| 291770 ||  || — || May 20, 2006 || Kitt Peak || Spacewatch || — || align=right data-sort-value="0.99" | 990 m || 
|-id=771 bgcolor=#fefefe
| 291771 ||  || — || May 20, 2006 || Kitt Peak || Spacewatch || — || align=right data-sort-value="0.73" | 730 m || 
|-id=772 bgcolor=#fefefe
| 291772 ||  || — || May 20, 2006 || Kitt Peak || Spacewatch || FLO || align=right data-sort-value="0.85" | 850 m || 
|-id=773 bgcolor=#d6d6d6
| 291773 ||  || — || May 20, 2006 || Kitt Peak || Spacewatch || THM || align=right | 2.4 km || 
|-id=774 bgcolor=#E9E9E9
| 291774 ||  || — || May 20, 2006 || Kitt Peak || Spacewatch || — || align=right | 1.3 km || 
|-id=775 bgcolor=#E9E9E9
| 291775 ||  || — || May 20, 2006 || Kitt Peak || Spacewatch || — || align=right | 1.1 km || 
|-id=776 bgcolor=#E9E9E9
| 291776 ||  || — || May 20, 2006 || Kitt Peak || Spacewatch || — || align=right | 1.2 km || 
|-id=777 bgcolor=#fefefe
| 291777 ||  || — || May 20, 2006 || Kitt Peak || Spacewatch || NYS || align=right data-sort-value="0.75" | 750 m || 
|-id=778 bgcolor=#fefefe
| 291778 ||  || — || May 20, 2006 || Kitt Peak || Spacewatch || MAS || align=right data-sort-value="0.83" | 830 m || 
|-id=779 bgcolor=#E9E9E9
| 291779 ||  || — || May 20, 2006 || Kitt Peak || Spacewatch || — || align=right | 2.3 km || 
|-id=780 bgcolor=#fefefe
| 291780 ||  || — || May 20, 2006 || Kitt Peak || Spacewatch || H || align=right data-sort-value="0.76" | 760 m || 
|-id=781 bgcolor=#fefefe
| 291781 ||  || — || May 17, 2006 || Palomar || NEAT || — || align=right | 1.0 km || 
|-id=782 bgcolor=#E9E9E9
| 291782 ||  || — || May 19, 2006 || Palomar || NEAT || — || align=right | 2.0 km || 
|-id=783 bgcolor=#fefefe
| 291783 ||  || — || May 20, 2006 || Kitt Peak || Spacewatch || FLO || align=right data-sort-value="0.69" | 690 m || 
|-id=784 bgcolor=#E9E9E9
| 291784 ||  || — || May 20, 2006 || Siding Spring || SSS || — || align=right | 1.5 km || 
|-id=785 bgcolor=#E9E9E9
| 291785 ||  || — || May 21, 2006 || Mount Lemmon || Mount Lemmon Survey || — || align=right | 1.2 km || 
|-id=786 bgcolor=#fefefe
| 291786 ||  || — || May 21, 2006 || Kitt Peak || Spacewatch || — || align=right | 1.1 km || 
|-id=787 bgcolor=#E9E9E9
| 291787 ||  || — || May 21, 2006 || Kitt Peak || Spacewatch || — || align=right | 1.8 km || 
|-id=788 bgcolor=#E9E9E9
| 291788 ||  || — || May 21, 2006 || Kitt Peak || Spacewatch || — || align=right | 2.7 km || 
|-id=789 bgcolor=#fefefe
| 291789 ||  || — || May 21, 2006 || Kitt Peak || Spacewatch || ERI || align=right | 1.8 km || 
|-id=790 bgcolor=#fefefe
| 291790 ||  || — || May 21, 2006 || Kitt Peak || Spacewatch || — || align=right data-sort-value="0.81" | 810 m || 
|-id=791 bgcolor=#E9E9E9
| 291791 ||  || — || May 21, 2006 || Palomar || NEAT || — || align=right | 1.5 km || 
|-id=792 bgcolor=#E9E9E9
| 291792 ||  || — || May 22, 2006 || Kitt Peak || Spacewatch || — || align=right | 2.8 km || 
|-id=793 bgcolor=#fefefe
| 291793 ||  || — || May 22, 2006 || Kitt Peak || Spacewatch || V || align=right data-sort-value="0.93" | 930 m || 
|-id=794 bgcolor=#E9E9E9
| 291794 ||  || — || May 23, 2006 || Kitt Peak || Spacewatch || — || align=right | 1.1 km || 
|-id=795 bgcolor=#fefefe
| 291795 ||  || — || May 23, 2006 || Mount Lemmon || Mount Lemmon Survey || FLO || align=right data-sort-value="0.85" | 850 m || 
|-id=796 bgcolor=#fefefe
| 291796 ||  || — || May 23, 2006 || Mount Lemmon || Mount Lemmon Survey || — || align=right data-sort-value="0.88" | 880 m || 
|-id=797 bgcolor=#E9E9E9
| 291797 ||  || — || May 24, 2006 || Mount Lemmon || Mount Lemmon Survey || — || align=right | 2.2 km || 
|-id=798 bgcolor=#E9E9E9
| 291798 ||  || — || May 19, 2006 || Palomar || NEAT || — || align=right | 2.0 km || 
|-id=799 bgcolor=#fefefe
| 291799 ||  || — || May 22, 2006 || Kitt Peak || Spacewatch || V || align=right data-sort-value="0.81" | 810 m || 
|-id=800 bgcolor=#fefefe
| 291800 ||  || — || May 22, 2006 || Kitt Peak || Spacewatch || — || align=right data-sort-value="0.93" | 930 m || 
|}

291801–291900 

|-bgcolor=#E9E9E9
| 291801 ||  || — || May 22, 2006 || Kitt Peak || Spacewatch || HNS || align=right | 1.5 km || 
|-id=802 bgcolor=#E9E9E9
| 291802 ||  || — || May 23, 2006 || Kitt Peak || Spacewatch || — || align=right | 1.3 km || 
|-id=803 bgcolor=#d6d6d6
| 291803 ||  || — || May 24, 2006 || Kitt Peak || Spacewatch || — || align=right | 4.9 km || 
|-id=804 bgcolor=#E9E9E9
| 291804 ||  || — || May 24, 2006 || Palomar || NEAT || — || align=right | 1.3 km || 
|-id=805 bgcolor=#fefefe
| 291805 ||  || — || May 25, 2006 || Mount Lemmon || Mount Lemmon Survey || — || align=right data-sort-value="0.86" | 860 m || 
|-id=806 bgcolor=#fefefe
| 291806 ||  || — || May 21, 2006 || Mount Lemmon || Mount Lemmon Survey || — || align=right | 1.5 km || 
|-id=807 bgcolor=#C2FFFF
| 291807 ||  || — || May 29, 2006 || Mount Lemmon || Mount Lemmon Survey || L5010 || align=right | 18 km || 
|-id=808 bgcolor=#E9E9E9
| 291808 ||  || — || May 24, 2006 || Palomar || NEAT || — || align=right | 4.2 km || 
|-id=809 bgcolor=#E9E9E9
| 291809 ||  || — || May 25, 2006 || Kitt Peak || Spacewatch || KON || align=right | 2.7 km || 
|-id=810 bgcolor=#d6d6d6
| 291810 ||  || — || May 25, 2006 || Kitt Peak || Spacewatch || — || align=right | 5.7 km || 
|-id=811 bgcolor=#E9E9E9
| 291811 ||  || — || May 25, 2006 || Kitt Peak || Spacewatch || HOF || align=right | 3.0 km || 
|-id=812 bgcolor=#E9E9E9
| 291812 ||  || — || May 25, 2006 || Kitt Peak || Spacewatch || MIS || align=right | 2.5 km || 
|-id=813 bgcolor=#fefefe
| 291813 ||  || — || May 25, 2006 || Mount Lemmon || Mount Lemmon Survey || — || align=right | 1.0 km || 
|-id=814 bgcolor=#E9E9E9
| 291814 ||  || — || May 26, 2006 || Kitt Peak || Spacewatch || — || align=right | 2.1 km || 
|-id=815 bgcolor=#E9E9E9
| 291815 ||  || — || May 27, 2006 || Catalina || CSS || — || align=right | 1.3 km || 
|-id=816 bgcolor=#E9E9E9
| 291816 ||  || — || May 28, 2006 || Socorro || LINEAR || — || align=right | 1.1 km || 
|-id=817 bgcolor=#fefefe
| 291817 ||  || — || May 24, 2006 || Kitt Peak || Spacewatch || LCI || align=right | 1.3 km || 
|-id=818 bgcolor=#d6d6d6
| 291818 ||  || — || May 28, 2006 || Kitt Peak || Spacewatch || — || align=right | 4.0 km || 
|-id=819 bgcolor=#fefefe
| 291819 ||  || — || May 29, 2006 || Kitt Peak || Spacewatch || MAS || align=right data-sort-value="0.75" | 750 m || 
|-id=820 bgcolor=#E9E9E9
| 291820 ||  || — || May 29, 2006 || Kitt Peak || Spacewatch || JUN || align=right data-sort-value="0.96" | 960 m || 
|-id=821 bgcolor=#fefefe
| 291821 ||  || — || May 30, 2006 || Mount Lemmon || Mount Lemmon Survey || NYS || align=right data-sort-value="0.84" | 840 m || 
|-id=822 bgcolor=#E9E9E9
| 291822 ||  || — || May 21, 2006 || Palomar || NEAT || MIT || align=right | 3.0 km || 
|-id=823 bgcolor=#E9E9E9
| 291823 ||  || — || May 23, 2006 || Siding Spring || SSS || — || align=right | 4.0 km || 
|-id=824 bgcolor=#fefefe
| 291824 ||  || — || May 25, 2006 || Mauna Kea || P. A. Wiegert || — || align=right | 1.2 km || 
|-id=825 bgcolor=#fefefe
| 291825 ||  || — || May 22, 2006 || Kitt Peak || Spacewatch || FLO || align=right data-sort-value="0.65" | 650 m || 
|-id=826 bgcolor=#fefefe
| 291826 ||  || — || May 20, 2006 || Kitt Peak || Spacewatch || FLO || align=right data-sort-value="0.66" | 660 m || 
|-id=827 bgcolor=#E9E9E9
| 291827 ||  || — || June 1, 2006 || Mount Lemmon || Mount Lemmon Survey || BRU || align=right | 2.6 km || 
|-id=828 bgcolor=#E9E9E9
| 291828 ||  || — || June 15, 2006 || Kitt Peak || Spacewatch || MAR || align=right | 1.5 km || 
|-id=829 bgcolor=#fefefe
| 291829 ||  || — || June 4, 2006 || Socorro || LINEAR || — || align=right data-sort-value="0.89" | 890 m || 
|-id=830 bgcolor=#E9E9E9
| 291830 ||  || — || June 4, 2006 || Socorro || LINEAR || — || align=right | 2.0 km || 
|-id=831 bgcolor=#E9E9E9
| 291831 ||  || — || June 15, 2006 || Kitt Peak || Spacewatch || — || align=right | 2.3 km || 
|-id=832 bgcolor=#E9E9E9
| 291832 ||  || — || June 11, 2006 || Palomar || NEAT || TIN || align=right | 4.5 km || 
|-id=833 bgcolor=#E9E9E9
| 291833 ||  || — || June 11, 2006 || Palomar || NEAT || — || align=right | 3.9 km || 
|-id=834 bgcolor=#fefefe
| 291834 ||  || — || June 3, 2006 || Catalina || CSS || — || align=right data-sort-value="0.94" | 940 m || 
|-id=835 bgcolor=#fefefe
| 291835 ||  || — || June 3, 2006 || Mount Lemmon || Mount Lemmon Survey || NYS || align=right data-sort-value="0.87" | 870 m || 
|-id=836 bgcolor=#fefefe
| 291836 ||  || — || June 9, 2006 || Palomar || NEAT || — || align=right data-sort-value="0.93" | 930 m || 
|-id=837 bgcolor=#fefefe
| 291837 ||  || — || June 16, 2006 || Kitt Peak || Spacewatch || — || align=right data-sort-value="0.92" | 920 m || 
|-id=838 bgcolor=#E9E9E9
| 291838 ||  || — || June 16, 2006 || Kitt Peak || Spacewatch || — || align=right | 1.2 km || 
|-id=839 bgcolor=#fefefe
| 291839 ||  || — || June 17, 2006 || Kitt Peak || Spacewatch || — || align=right data-sort-value="0.77" | 770 m || 
|-id=840 bgcolor=#E9E9E9
| 291840 ||  || — || June 17, 2006 || Kitt Peak || Spacewatch || MAR || align=right | 1.2 km || 
|-id=841 bgcolor=#d6d6d6
| 291841 ||  || — || June 18, 2006 || Kitt Peak || Spacewatch || TEL || align=right | 2.0 km || 
|-id=842 bgcolor=#E9E9E9
| 291842 ||  || — || June 18, 2006 || Kitt Peak || Spacewatch || HEN || align=right | 1.3 km || 
|-id=843 bgcolor=#fefefe
| 291843 ||  || — || June 19, 2006 || Mount Lemmon || Mount Lemmon Survey || — || align=right data-sort-value="0.86" | 860 m || 
|-id=844 bgcolor=#fefefe
| 291844 ||  || — || June 24, 2006 || Hibiscus || S. F. Hönig || — || align=right | 1.1 km || 
|-id=845 bgcolor=#E9E9E9
| 291845 ||  || — || June 27, 2006 || Siding Spring || SSS || BAR || align=right | 1.9 km || 
|-id=846 bgcolor=#E9E9E9
| 291846 ||  || — || June 17, 2006 || Siding Spring || SSS || EUN || align=right | 2.0 km || 
|-id=847 bgcolor=#fefefe
| 291847 Ladoix ||  ||  || July 19, 2006 || Vicques || M. Ory || — || align=right | 1.0 km || 
|-id=848 bgcolor=#E9E9E9
| 291848 ||  || — || July 18, 2006 || Reedy Creek || J. Broughton || — || align=right | 3.0 km || 
|-id=849 bgcolor=#E9E9E9
| 291849 Orchestralondon ||  ||  || July 18, 2006 || Lulin Observatory || Q.-z. Ye, H.-C. Lin || — || align=right | 2.6 km || 
|-id=850 bgcolor=#fefefe
| 291850 ||  || — || July 22, 2006 || Pla D'Arguines || R. Ferrando || — || align=right data-sort-value="0.98" | 980 m || 
|-id=851 bgcolor=#fefefe
| 291851 ||  || — || July 19, 2006 || Palomar || NEAT || — || align=right | 1.2 km || 
|-id=852 bgcolor=#fefefe
| 291852 ||  || — || July 20, 2006 || Palomar || NEAT || — || align=right data-sort-value="0.97" | 970 m || 
|-id=853 bgcolor=#fefefe
| 291853 ||  || — || July 24, 2006 || Hibiscus || S. F. Hönig || FLO || align=right data-sort-value="0.63" | 630 m || 
|-id=854 bgcolor=#d6d6d6
| 291854 ||  || — || July 21, 2006 || Palomar || NEAT || — || align=right | 6.7 km || 
|-id=855 bgcolor=#fefefe
| 291855 Calabròcorrado ||  ||  || July 28, 2006 || Andrushivka || Andrushivka Obs. || NYS || align=right data-sort-value="0.79" | 790 m || 
|-id=856 bgcolor=#E9E9E9
| 291856 ||  || — || July 20, 2006 || Reedy Creek || J. Broughton || — || align=right | 3.0 km || 
|-id=857 bgcolor=#fefefe
| 291857 ||  || — || July 29, 2006 || Reedy Creek || J. Broughton || — || align=right data-sort-value="0.98" | 980 m || 
|-id=858 bgcolor=#fefefe
| 291858 ||  || — || July 20, 2006 || Palomar || NEAT || — || align=right | 1.1 km || 
|-id=859 bgcolor=#d6d6d6
| 291859 ||  || — || July 20, 2006 || Siding Spring || SSS || THB || align=right | 6.0 km || 
|-id=860 bgcolor=#E9E9E9
| 291860 ||  || — || July 30, 2006 || Siding Spring || SSS || EUN || align=right | 1.7 km || 
|-id=861 bgcolor=#d6d6d6
| 291861 ||  || — || August 2, 2006 || Pla D'Arguines || R. Ferrando || — || align=right | 4.6 km || 
|-id=862 bgcolor=#E9E9E9
| 291862 ||  || — || August 11, 2006 || Lulin || H.-C. Lin, Q.-z. Ye || — || align=right | 2.1 km || 
|-id=863 bgcolor=#E9E9E9
| 291863 ||  || — || August 12, 2006 || Palomar || NEAT || — || align=right | 3.0 km || 
|-id=864 bgcolor=#fefefe
| 291864 ||  || — || August 15, 2006 || Reedy Creek || J. Broughton || FLO || align=right data-sort-value="0.75" | 750 m || 
|-id=865 bgcolor=#E9E9E9
| 291865 ||  || — || August 12, 2006 || Palomar || NEAT || — || align=right | 3.0 km || 
|-id=866 bgcolor=#fefefe
| 291866 ||  || — || August 12, 2006 || Palomar || NEAT || NYS || align=right data-sort-value="0.73" | 730 m || 
|-id=867 bgcolor=#fefefe
| 291867 ||  || — || November 18, 1996 || Kitt Peak || Spacewatch || V || align=right data-sort-value="0.88" | 880 m || 
|-id=868 bgcolor=#fefefe
| 291868 ||  || — || August 12, 2006 || Palomar || NEAT || — || align=right data-sort-value="0.97" | 970 m || 
|-id=869 bgcolor=#fefefe
| 291869 ||  || — || August 13, 2006 || Palomar || NEAT || NYS || align=right data-sort-value="0.54" | 540 m || 
|-id=870 bgcolor=#fefefe
| 291870 ||  || — || August 13, 2006 || Palomar || NEAT || — || align=right | 1.1 km || 
|-id=871 bgcolor=#fefefe
| 291871 ||  || — || August 13, 2006 || Palomar || NEAT || — || align=right data-sort-value="0.78" | 780 m || 
|-id=872 bgcolor=#fefefe
| 291872 ||  || — || August 13, 2006 || Palomar || NEAT || NYS || align=right data-sort-value="0.82" | 820 m || 
|-id=873 bgcolor=#fefefe
| 291873 ||  || — || August 13, 2006 || Palomar || NEAT || — || align=right data-sort-value="0.92" | 920 m || 
|-id=874 bgcolor=#E9E9E9
| 291874 ||  || — || August 13, 2006 || Palomar || NEAT || KAZ || align=right | 1.3 km || 
|-id=875 bgcolor=#fefefe
| 291875 ||  || — || August 15, 2006 || Palomar || NEAT || FLO || align=right data-sort-value="0.78" | 780 m || 
|-id=876 bgcolor=#E9E9E9
| 291876 ||  || — || August 15, 2006 || Lulin Observatory || C.-S. Lin, Q.-z. Ye || RAF || align=right | 1.1 km || 
|-id=877 bgcolor=#FA8072
| 291877 ||  || — || August 15, 2006 || Palomar || NEAT || — || align=right | 1.0 km || 
|-id=878 bgcolor=#fefefe
| 291878 ||  || — || August 13, 2006 || Palomar || NEAT || NYS || align=right data-sort-value="0.81" | 810 m || 
|-id=879 bgcolor=#fefefe
| 291879 ||  || — || August 13, 2006 || Palomar || NEAT || NYS || align=right data-sort-value="0.84" | 840 m || 
|-id=880 bgcolor=#fefefe
| 291880 ||  || — || August 15, 2006 || Palomar || NEAT || — || align=right data-sort-value="0.83" | 830 m || 
|-id=881 bgcolor=#fefefe
| 291881 ||  || — || August 15, 2006 || Lulin || C.-S. Lin, Q.-z. Ye || NYS || align=right data-sort-value="0.86" | 860 m || 
|-id=882 bgcolor=#E9E9E9
| 291882 ||  || — || August 15, 2006 || Siding Spring || SSS || JUN || align=right | 1.4 km || 
|-id=883 bgcolor=#fefefe
| 291883 ||  || — || August 12, 2006 || Palomar || NEAT || NYS || align=right data-sort-value="0.80" | 800 m || 
|-id=884 bgcolor=#fefefe
| 291884 ||  || — || August 12, 2006 || Palomar || NEAT || — || align=right data-sort-value="0.98" | 980 m || 
|-id=885 bgcolor=#fefefe
| 291885 ||  || — || August 13, 2006 || Palomar || NEAT || MAS || align=right data-sort-value="0.93" | 930 m || 
|-id=886 bgcolor=#fefefe
| 291886 ||  || — || August 15, 2006 || Palomar || NEAT || NYS || align=right data-sort-value="0.74" | 740 m || 
|-id=887 bgcolor=#fefefe
| 291887 ||  || — || August 15, 2006 || Palomar || NEAT || NYS || align=right data-sort-value="0.79" | 790 m || 
|-id=888 bgcolor=#fefefe
| 291888 ||  || — || August 10, 2006 || Palomar || NEAT || FLO || align=right data-sort-value="0.98" | 980 m || 
|-id=889 bgcolor=#E9E9E9
| 291889 ||  || — || August 12, 2006 || Palomar || NEAT || GEF || align=right | 1.8 km || 
|-id=890 bgcolor=#d6d6d6
| 291890 ||  || — || August 13, 2006 || Palomar || NEAT || — || align=right | 3.6 km || 
|-id=891 bgcolor=#fefefe
| 291891 ||  || — || August 12, 2006 || Palomar || NEAT || — || align=right | 1.0 km || 
|-id=892 bgcolor=#fefefe
| 291892 ||  || — || August 12, 2006 || Palomar || NEAT || — || align=right | 1.1 km || 
|-id=893 bgcolor=#E9E9E9
| 291893 ||  || — || August 12, 2006 || Palomar || NEAT || — || align=right | 1.3 km || 
|-id=894 bgcolor=#E9E9E9
| 291894 ||  || — || August 14, 2006 || Siding Spring || SSS || — || align=right | 1.2 km || 
|-id=895 bgcolor=#fefefe
| 291895 ||  || — || August 16, 2006 || Siding Spring || SSS || — || align=right | 1.0 km || 
|-id=896 bgcolor=#E9E9E9
| 291896 ||  || — || August 18, 2006 || Kitt Peak || Spacewatch || — || align=right | 2.8 km || 
|-id=897 bgcolor=#d6d6d6
| 291897 ||  || — || August 18, 2006 || Kitt Peak || Spacewatch || KOR || align=right | 1.7 km || 
|-id=898 bgcolor=#fefefe
| 291898 ||  || — || August 17, 2006 || Goodricke-Pigott || R. A. Tucker || — || align=right | 1.3 km || 
|-id=899 bgcolor=#fefefe
| 291899 ||  || — || August 18, 2006 || Piszkéstető || K. Sárneczky, Z. Kuli || MAS || align=right data-sort-value="0.69" | 690 m || 
|-id=900 bgcolor=#d6d6d6
| 291900 ||  || — || August 19, 2006 || Piszkéstető || K. Sárneczky, Z. Kuli || THB || align=right | 3.6 km || 
|}

291901–292000 

|-bgcolor=#fefefe
| 291901 ||  || — || August 19, 2006 || Kitt Peak || Spacewatch || EUT || align=right data-sort-value="0.68" | 680 m || 
|-id=902 bgcolor=#fefefe
| 291902 ||  || — || August 19, 2006 || Kitt Peak || Spacewatch || V || align=right data-sort-value="0.81" | 810 m || 
|-id=903 bgcolor=#E9E9E9
| 291903 ||  || — || August 19, 2006 || Kitt Peak || Spacewatch || WIT || align=right | 1.4 km || 
|-id=904 bgcolor=#E9E9E9
| 291904 ||  || — || August 19, 2006 || Kitt Peak || Spacewatch || — || align=right | 3.9 km || 
|-id=905 bgcolor=#d6d6d6
| 291905 ||  || — || August 19, 2006 || Kitt Peak || Spacewatch || — || align=right | 4.4 km || 
|-id=906 bgcolor=#E9E9E9
| 291906 ||  || — || August 19, 2006 || Reedy Creek || J. Broughton || EUN || align=right | 1.6 km || 
|-id=907 bgcolor=#FA8072
| 291907 ||  || — || August 17, 2006 || Palomar || NEAT || — || align=right data-sort-value="0.68" | 680 m || 
|-id=908 bgcolor=#d6d6d6
| 291908 ||  || — || August 16, 2006 || Siding Spring || SSS || — || align=right | 4.0 km || 
|-id=909 bgcolor=#fefefe
| 291909 ||  || — || August 16, 2006 || Siding Spring || SSS || NYS || align=right data-sort-value="0.87" | 870 m || 
|-id=910 bgcolor=#E9E9E9
| 291910 ||  || — || August 16, 2006 || Siding Spring || SSS || TIN || align=right | 2.6 km || 
|-id=911 bgcolor=#d6d6d6
| 291911 ||  || — || August 16, 2006 || Siding Spring || SSS || — || align=right | 4.0 km || 
|-id=912 bgcolor=#E9E9E9
| 291912 ||  || — || August 17, 2006 || Palomar || NEAT || — || align=right | 1.4 km || 
|-id=913 bgcolor=#E9E9E9
| 291913 ||  || — || August 17, 2006 || Palomar || NEAT || — || align=right | 3.0 km || 
|-id=914 bgcolor=#fefefe
| 291914 ||  || — || August 17, 2006 || Palomar || NEAT || FLO || align=right data-sort-value="0.82" | 820 m || 
|-id=915 bgcolor=#fefefe
| 291915 ||  || — || August 17, 2006 || Palomar || NEAT || NYS || align=right data-sort-value="0.93" | 930 m || 
|-id=916 bgcolor=#fefefe
| 291916 ||  || — || August 17, 2006 || Palomar || NEAT || FLO || align=right data-sort-value="0.82" | 820 m || 
|-id=917 bgcolor=#E9E9E9
| 291917 ||  || — || August 17, 2006 || Palomar || NEAT || — || align=right | 2.1 km || 
|-id=918 bgcolor=#fefefe
| 291918 ||  || — || August 17, 2006 || Palomar || NEAT || — || align=right | 1.0 km || 
|-id=919 bgcolor=#FA8072
| 291919 ||  || — || August 18, 2006 || Anderson Mesa || LONEOS || — || align=right | 1.1 km || 
|-id=920 bgcolor=#FA8072
| 291920 ||  || — || August 19, 2006 || Anderson Mesa || LONEOS || — || align=right data-sort-value="0.94" | 940 m || 
|-id=921 bgcolor=#fefefe
| 291921 ||  || — || August 21, 2006 || Dax || Dax Obs. || V || align=right data-sort-value="0.85" | 850 m || 
|-id=922 bgcolor=#E9E9E9
| 291922 ||  || — || August 20, 2006 || Wildberg || R. Apitzsch || MRX || align=right | 1.1 km || 
|-id=923 bgcolor=#fefefe
| 291923 Kuzmaskryabin ||  ||  || August 16, 2006 || Andrushivka || Andrushivka Obs. || NYS || align=right data-sort-value="0.74" | 740 m || 
|-id=924 bgcolor=#E9E9E9
| 291924 ||  || — || August 18, 2006 || Socorro || LINEAR || — || align=right | 3.1 km || 
|-id=925 bgcolor=#E9E9E9
| 291925 ||  || — || August 19, 2006 || Kitt Peak || Spacewatch || — || align=right | 1.7 km || 
|-id=926 bgcolor=#E9E9E9
| 291926 ||  || — || August 19, 2006 || Kitt Peak || Spacewatch || — || align=right | 3.0 km || 
|-id=927 bgcolor=#fefefe
| 291927 ||  || — || August 19, 2006 || Palomar || NEAT || — || align=right | 1.3 km || 
|-id=928 bgcolor=#E9E9E9
| 291928 ||  || — || August 20, 2006 || Kitt Peak || Spacewatch || — || align=right | 1.8 km || 
|-id=929 bgcolor=#E9E9E9
| 291929 ||  || — || August 20, 2006 || Kitt Peak || Spacewatch || — || align=right | 2.0 km || 
|-id=930 bgcolor=#fefefe
| 291930 ||  || — || August 21, 2006 || Kitt Peak || Spacewatch || MAS || align=right data-sort-value="0.66" | 660 m || 
|-id=931 bgcolor=#E9E9E9
| 291931 ||  || — || August 21, 2006 || Kitt Peak || Spacewatch || — || align=right | 2.1 km || 
|-id=932 bgcolor=#fefefe
| 291932 ||  || — || August 16, 2006 || Siding Spring || SSS || NYS || align=right data-sort-value="0.82" | 820 m || 
|-id=933 bgcolor=#fefefe
| 291933 ||  || — || August 20, 2006 || Palomar || NEAT || NYS || align=right data-sort-value="0.86" | 860 m || 
|-id=934 bgcolor=#fefefe
| 291934 ||  || — || August 21, 2006 || Socorro || LINEAR || — || align=right data-sort-value="0.79" | 790 m || 
|-id=935 bgcolor=#E9E9E9
| 291935 ||  || — || August 22, 2006 || Palomar || NEAT || GEF || align=right | 2.3 km || 
|-id=936 bgcolor=#d6d6d6
| 291936 ||  || — || August 22, 2006 || Palomar || NEAT || — || align=right | 5.0 km || 
|-id=937 bgcolor=#d6d6d6
| 291937 ||  || — || August 22, 2006 || Reedy Creek || J. Broughton || TIR || align=right | 4.4 km || 
|-id=938 bgcolor=#d6d6d6
| 291938 ||  || — || August 21, 2006 || Palomar || NEAT || Tj (2.94) || align=right | 5.9 km || 
|-id=939 bgcolor=#E9E9E9
| 291939 ||  || — || August 22, 2006 || Palomar || NEAT || INO || align=right | 1.8 km || 
|-id=940 bgcolor=#d6d6d6
| 291940 ||  || — || August 23, 2006 || Hibiscus || S. F. Hönig || — || align=right | 3.0 km || 
|-id=941 bgcolor=#E9E9E9
| 291941 ||  || — || August 23, 2006 || Marly || Naef Obs. || — || align=right | 1.7 km || 
|-id=942 bgcolor=#E9E9E9
| 291942 ||  || — || August 22, 2006 || Palomar || NEAT || GEF || align=right | 1.5 km || 
|-id=943 bgcolor=#E9E9E9
| 291943 ||  || — || August 19, 2006 || Palomar || NEAT || — || align=right | 2.0 km || 
|-id=944 bgcolor=#E9E9E9
| 291944 ||  || — || August 21, 2006 || Palomar || NEAT || — || align=right | 3.1 km || 
|-id=945 bgcolor=#fefefe
| 291945 ||  || — || August 16, 2006 || Siding Spring || SSS || NYS || align=right data-sort-value="0.82" | 820 m || 
|-id=946 bgcolor=#fefefe
| 291946 ||  || — || August 16, 2006 || Siding Spring || SSS || — || align=right data-sort-value="0.97" | 970 m || 
|-id=947 bgcolor=#E9E9E9
| 291947 ||  || — || August 18, 2006 || Anderson Mesa || LONEOS || — || align=right | 3.3 km || 
|-id=948 bgcolor=#fefefe
| 291948 ||  || — || August 17, 2006 || Palomar || NEAT || FLO || align=right data-sort-value="0.56" | 560 m || 
|-id=949 bgcolor=#fefefe
| 291949 ||  || — || August 17, 2006 || Palomar || NEAT || — || align=right | 1.8 km || 
|-id=950 bgcolor=#fefefe
| 291950 ||  || — || August 17, 2006 || Palomar || NEAT || — || align=right data-sort-value="0.87" | 870 m || 
|-id=951 bgcolor=#E9E9E9
| 291951 ||  || — || August 17, 2006 || Palomar || NEAT || BRU || align=right | 3.3 km || 
|-id=952 bgcolor=#fefefe
| 291952 ||  || — || August 17, 2006 || Palomar || NEAT || NYS || align=right data-sort-value="0.73" | 730 m || 
|-id=953 bgcolor=#E9E9E9
| 291953 ||  || — || August 17, 2006 || Palomar || NEAT || — || align=right | 1.9 km || 
|-id=954 bgcolor=#fefefe
| 291954 ||  || — || August 17, 2006 || Palomar || NEAT || — || align=right data-sort-value="0.96" | 960 m || 
|-id=955 bgcolor=#E9E9E9
| 291955 ||  || — || August 18, 2006 || Kitt Peak || Spacewatch || ADE || align=right | 2.7 km || 
|-id=956 bgcolor=#fefefe
| 291956 ||  || — || August 19, 2006 || Palomar || NEAT || — || align=right data-sort-value="0.97" | 970 m || 
|-id=957 bgcolor=#E9E9E9
| 291957 ||  || — || August 20, 2006 || Palomar || NEAT || — || align=right | 2.9 km || 
|-id=958 bgcolor=#E9E9E9
| 291958 ||  || — || August 20, 2006 || Palomar || NEAT || — || align=right | 1.2 km || 
|-id=959 bgcolor=#fefefe
| 291959 ||  || — || August 23, 2006 || Palomar || NEAT || — || align=right | 1.1 km || 
|-id=960 bgcolor=#fefefe
| 291960 ||  || — || August 23, 2006 || Palomar || NEAT || — || align=right | 1.0 km || 
|-id=961 bgcolor=#d6d6d6
| 291961 ||  || — || August 23, 2006 || Palomar || NEAT || — || align=right | 3.6 km || 
|-id=962 bgcolor=#fefefe
| 291962 ||  || — || August 23, 2006 || Palomar || NEAT || NYS || align=right data-sort-value="0.81" | 810 m || 
|-id=963 bgcolor=#fefefe
| 291963 ||  || — || August 17, 2006 || Palomar || NEAT || — || align=right | 1.6 km || 
|-id=964 bgcolor=#fefefe
| 291964 ||  || — || August 26, 2006 || Socorro || LINEAR || — || align=right | 1.3 km || 
|-id=965 bgcolor=#fefefe
| 291965 ||  || — || August 19, 2006 || Anderson Mesa || LONEOS || — || align=right | 1.1 km || 
|-id=966 bgcolor=#fefefe
| 291966 ||  || — || August 21, 2006 || Socorro || LINEAR || — || align=right data-sort-value="0.91" | 910 m || 
|-id=967 bgcolor=#fefefe
| 291967 ||  || — || August 22, 2006 || Palomar || NEAT || — || align=right | 1.3 km || 
|-id=968 bgcolor=#d6d6d6
| 291968 ||  || — || August 24, 2006 || Palomar || NEAT || — || align=right | 4.0 km || 
|-id=969 bgcolor=#E9E9E9
| 291969 ||  || — || August 27, 2006 || Kitt Peak || Spacewatch || — || align=right | 2.9 km || 
|-id=970 bgcolor=#fefefe
| 291970 ||  || — || August 20, 2006 || Kitt Peak || Spacewatch || V || align=right data-sort-value="0.72" | 720 m || 
|-id=971 bgcolor=#d6d6d6
| 291971 ||  || — || August 21, 2006 || Kitt Peak || Spacewatch || — || align=right | 4.4 km || 
|-id=972 bgcolor=#d6d6d6
| 291972 ||  || — || August 22, 2006 || Palomar || NEAT || HYG || align=right | 3.2 km || 
|-id=973 bgcolor=#fefefe
| 291973 ||  || — || August 22, 2006 || Palomar || NEAT || — || align=right | 1.0 km || 
|-id=974 bgcolor=#fefefe
| 291974 ||  || — || August 22, 2006 || Palomar || NEAT || MAS || align=right data-sort-value="0.82" | 820 m || 
|-id=975 bgcolor=#fefefe
| 291975 ||  || — || August 22, 2006 || Palomar || NEAT || NYS || align=right data-sort-value="0.70" | 700 m || 
|-id=976 bgcolor=#d6d6d6
| 291976 ||  || — || August 22, 2006 || Palomar || NEAT || — || align=right | 5.5 km || 
|-id=977 bgcolor=#d6d6d6
| 291977 ||  || — || August 24, 2006 || Socorro || LINEAR || — || align=right | 5.4 km || 
|-id=978 bgcolor=#fefefe
| 291978 ||  || — || August 27, 2006 || Kitt Peak || Spacewatch || — || align=right data-sort-value="0.79" | 790 m || 
|-id=979 bgcolor=#E9E9E9
| 291979 ||  || — || August 27, 2006 || Kitt Peak || Spacewatch || — || align=right | 2.2 km || 
|-id=980 bgcolor=#E9E9E9
| 291980 ||  || — || August 27, 2006 || Kitt Peak || Spacewatch || CLO || align=right | 2.2 km || 
|-id=981 bgcolor=#E9E9E9
| 291981 ||  || — || August 27, 2006 || Kitt Peak || Spacewatch || AGN || align=right | 1.9 km || 
|-id=982 bgcolor=#fefefe
| 291982 ||  || — || August 27, 2006 || Kitt Peak || Spacewatch || MAS || align=right data-sort-value="0.78" | 780 m || 
|-id=983 bgcolor=#fefefe
| 291983 ||  || — || August 16, 2006 || Palomar || NEAT || — || align=right data-sort-value="0.97" | 970 m || 
|-id=984 bgcolor=#fefefe
| 291984 ||  || — || August 16, 2006 || Palomar || NEAT || — || align=right | 1.2 km || 
|-id=985 bgcolor=#fefefe
| 291985 ||  || — || August 17, 2006 || Palomar || NEAT || V || align=right data-sort-value="0.87" | 870 m || 
|-id=986 bgcolor=#d6d6d6
| 291986 ||  || — || August 20, 2006 || Kitt Peak || Spacewatch || CHA || align=right | 2.5 km || 
|-id=987 bgcolor=#fefefe
| 291987 ||  || — || August 20, 2006 || Kitt Peak || Spacewatch || — || align=right data-sort-value="0.77" | 770 m || 
|-id=988 bgcolor=#E9E9E9
| 291988 ||  || — || August 23, 2006 || Palomar || NEAT || — || align=right | 3.7 km || 
|-id=989 bgcolor=#fefefe
| 291989 ||  || — || August 24, 2006 || Palomar || NEAT || — || align=right data-sort-value="0.82" | 820 m || 
|-id=990 bgcolor=#fefefe
| 291990 ||  || — || August 28, 2006 || Anderson Mesa || LONEOS || — || align=right | 1.1 km || 
|-id=991 bgcolor=#E9E9E9
| 291991 ||  || — || August 28, 2006 || Catalina || CSS || — || align=right | 1.3 km || 
|-id=992 bgcolor=#fefefe
| 291992 ||  || — || August 28, 2006 || Anderson Mesa || LONEOS || — || align=right | 1.7 km || 
|-id=993 bgcolor=#fefefe
| 291993 ||  || — || August 28, 2006 || Catalina || CSS || NYS || align=right data-sort-value="0.62" | 620 m || 
|-id=994 bgcolor=#fefefe
| 291994 ||  || — || August 28, 2006 || Catalina || CSS || NYS || align=right data-sort-value="0.70" | 700 m || 
|-id=995 bgcolor=#fefefe
| 291995 ||  || — || August 22, 2006 || Palomar || NEAT || V || align=right data-sort-value="0.79" | 790 m || 
|-id=996 bgcolor=#fefefe
| 291996 ||  || — || August 23, 2006 || Palomar || NEAT || FLO || align=right data-sort-value="0.84" | 840 m || 
|-id=997 bgcolor=#fefefe
| 291997 ||  || — || August 24, 2006 || Socorro || LINEAR || — || align=right | 1.1 km || 
|-id=998 bgcolor=#E9E9E9
| 291998 ||  || — || August 27, 2006 || Anderson Mesa || LONEOS || — || align=right | 1.9 km || 
|-id=999 bgcolor=#E9E9E9
| 291999 ||  || — || August 27, 2006 || Anderson Mesa || LONEOS || — || align=right | 3.7 km || 
|-id=000 bgcolor=#E9E9E9
| 292000 ||  || — || August 27, 2006 || Anderson Mesa || LONEOS || — || align=right | 1.1 km || 
|}

References

External links 
 Discovery Circumstances: Numbered Minor Planets (290001)–(295000) (IAU Minor Planet Center)

0291